= Ropalidia fasciata =

Conservation status
- Least Concern (IUCN 3.1)

Scientific classification
- Kingdom: Animalia
- Phylum: Arthropoda
- Clade: Pancrustacea
- Class: Insecta
- Order: Hymenoptera
- Family: Vespidae
- Subfamily: Polistinae
- Tribe: Ropalidiini
- Genus: Ropalidia
- Species: R. fasciata

Binomial name
- Ropalidia fasciata (Fabricius, 1804)

Synonyms
- Icaria intermedia, Cameron, 1905 Icaria maculifrons, Cameron, 1903 Icaria picta, de Saussure, 1853

Species of wasp

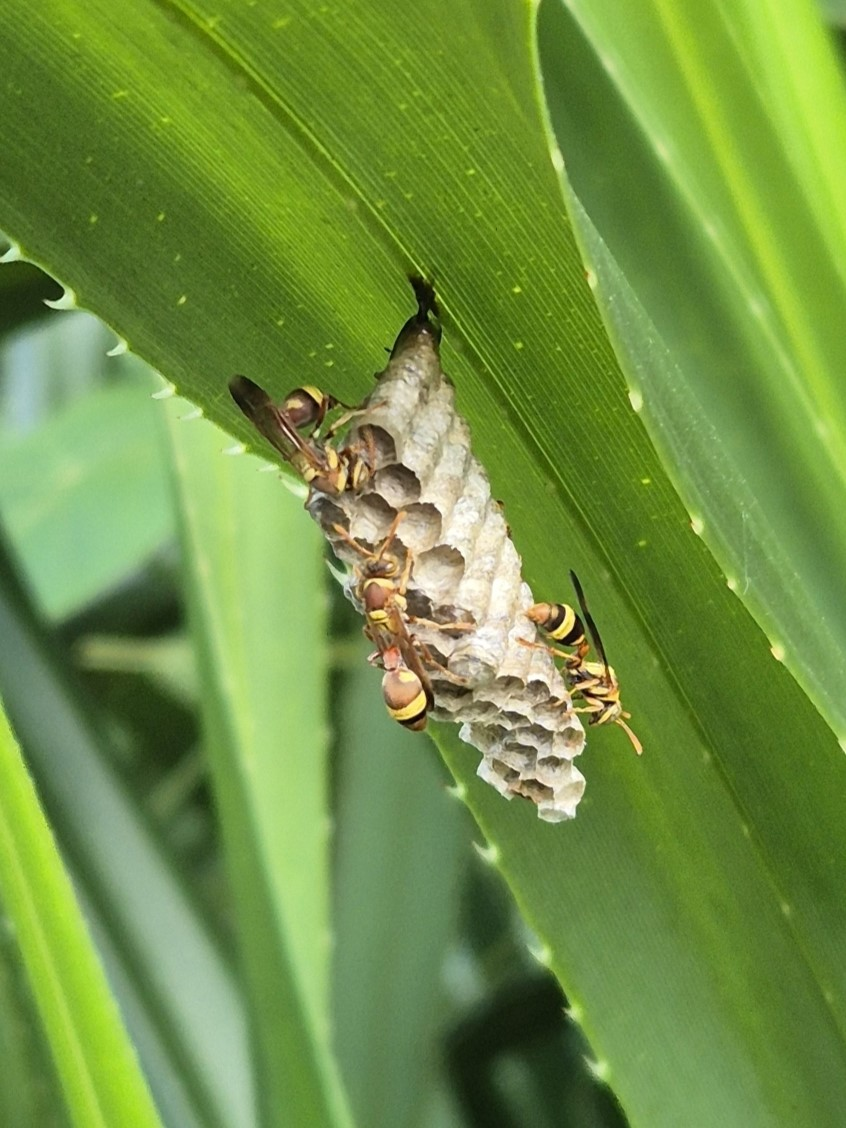
Ropalidia fasciata (Onna, Okinawa)

Ropalidia fasciata, a common paper wasp, is a wide-ranging species that is distributed from India to the Lesser Sunda Islands, Palawan, and Ryukyu Islands, occupying the northern edge of Ropalidia's larger distribution. These primitively eusocial wasps are unique in that they do not exhibit the strict matrifilial, single-queen social structure found in many species of social insects. Instead, colonies are founded based on associations between several females, or 'foundresses'.

== Taxonomy and phylogeny ==
Ropalidia fasciata belongs to one of the largest wasp taxa. Roughly 180 other species belong to the genus Ropalidia. In discussion, R. fasciata is often grouped with and compared to Ropalidia marginata. R. fasciata was classified by Johan Christian Fabricius in 1804.

== Description and identification ==
R. fasciata appears with a red-brown body with yellow stripes, and some black and yellow markings. The species are variable in color pattern, displaying the black markings to various degrees. Queen-like and worker-like individuals are not morphologically distinguishable, but instead are differentiated based on behavior.

== Distribution and habitat ==
R. fasciata is distributed consistently throughout grasslands within its range, mainly inhabiting fields that are invaded by the sugarcane Miscanthus sinensis. The wasps prefer to build nests under the leaves of this plant.

== Colony cycle ==
Colonies are founded in the spring, most often by associations of multiple females. Females that hatched early the year before are referred to as 'foundresses', as they can choose to go on to found a new colony. R. fasciata have an annual, relatively long colony cycle that begins in April and continues into November or December. The first group to emerge from the nest in the spring are females who quickly adopt forager or fighter roles in the colony. Potential foundresses and males emerge later in the summer. Males are commonly found in both established and newly founded nests, a quality specific to tropical eusocial wasps. Unlike many species of temperate wasps, females do not attack these individuals. Foundress survival rate from April until September can be as low as 1.4%, indicating that most foundresses die before the end of the season. However, nest densities are quite stable from year to year due to the species' flexible reproductive habits and persistence in nest maintenance and rebuilding. The qualities of R. fasciata's colony cycle are very similar to that of other primitively eusocial wasps.

== Behavior ==
=== Dominance hierarchy ===
Colonies have multiple founding females who cooperate and perform different roles. Although dominant behavior is not especially clear as in other social insects, a queen-like individual is determined for the colony. She spends most of her time at the nest and consistently takes an alarm posture when an enemy approaches, guiding the rest of the colony's behavior. This individual can be said to be more dominant than the rest, and the other foundresses take on worker-like roles. Unlike species of related wasps of the genera Polistes and Mischocyttarus, this queen-like individual does not show obvious aggression or acts of dominance toward others in the nest. Even when actions that are considered dominant in other species are performed, the receiving individual does not adopt a submissive posture. Instead, the individual ignores her and continues its previous activity.

=== Division of labor ===
The genus Ropalidia has a standard colony structure where individuals are divided into three castes: sitters, fighters, and foragers. Sitters and fighters leave the food-finding to the foragers, while they care for larvae and maintain the nest. Foragers generally have poorly developed ovaries, while both fighters and sitters are, in theory, capable of reproduction. Yosiaki Ito, an expert on the wasps, purposefully does not refer to the resident individuals of R. fasciata as ‘workers’ since early-emerging individuals may be able to found their own nests or to produce female progeny at their current nest. Considerable variability and opportunity for reproduction exists for many individuals within the colony. This is in contrast to the strategies of many social insects, where caste has a large morphological component and only one reproductive female is maintained. The very flexible colony structure of R. fasciata may be an adaptation to variable environmental conditions, as nests are often destroyed by typhoons, ant predation, and parasites.

=== Reproductive suppression ===
Reproductive suppression does not appear to be a major part of R. fasciata’s strategy. 'First brood' females (females that emerge first in a season) have the option to found their own colony, lay eggs, or work for their natal colony. Multiple egg laying females contribute to a colony, and interactions between these females appear to be mild. It has been suggested that through a subtle dominance hierarchy among foundresses, the queen-like individual can suppress the oviposition of others, but observers have recorded little aggression of dominant or suppressive behavior to support this.

=== Reproductive behavior ===
All species within the subfamily Polistinae, including R. fasciata, are understood to be eusocial. The insects fall into two categories: monogynous, with a single female reproductive, and polygynous, with several. In R. fasciata, monogyny is said to be facultative. Subordinate females' reproductive capacity is only partially inhibited biologically or behaviorally suppressed. First brood females emerge and mate before overwintering. Males emerge in late May and attempt matings with workers and foundresses. It is unknown if the foundresses monopolize reproduction, and this is an important question as it defines the function of the caste system of this species. Nests are reconstructed and eggs are laid in March.

== Kin selection ==
A complication in the typical explanation of eusocial insects exists for R. fasciata. Since multiple females remain reproductive in a group, the colony must function less like a cooperative organism and a higher degree of reproductive competition is expected. Intercolony relatedness is expected to be reduced in these wasps.

== Nesting ==
Ropalidia fasciata and related species construct nests by collecting fibers from dead vegetation, mixing them with saliva, and using this mixture to construct vertical cells. The resulting material has a paper-like structure, hence their common name, the paper wasp. R. fasciata often builds additional satellite nests as alternatives to the nest where the colony resides. That way if the main nest is destroyed, damaged, or threatened, at least some of the group can move to another nest. Occasionally, groups may relocate to a new nest without obvious cause. The immature wasps in the colony are moved to the new location by adults. Both foundresses and their progeny will help reconstruct a nest. R. fasciata foundresses do not disperse far from their natal nests, and foundresses of the same nest are often sisters. In this species, it has been shown that if many females collaborate to found a nest, it will grow faster and have a higher survival rate than one with fewer foundresses.

== Food sharing ==
Individuals in a colony habitually share food with one another. One wasp will transfer nectar or water by mouth to another wasp by regurgitation. This behavior takes place between individuals who have not received any food recently, and the touching of mouthparts will occur even when there is no food to be transferred. Liquid food sharing between individuals typically reinforces the dominance hierarchy in similar species of wasp, but in R. fasciata this behavior appears to be a simple nutrition sharing technique or even a greeting, unrelated to dominance.

== Interactions with other species ==
R. fasciata nests are often predated upon by various species of ants, which attack immature R. fasciata individuals and can have a severe impact on nest survival. An ichneumonid parasite Arthula formosana commonly parasitizes R. fasciata nests. The frequency of parasitism has been shown to increase during the summer months.
