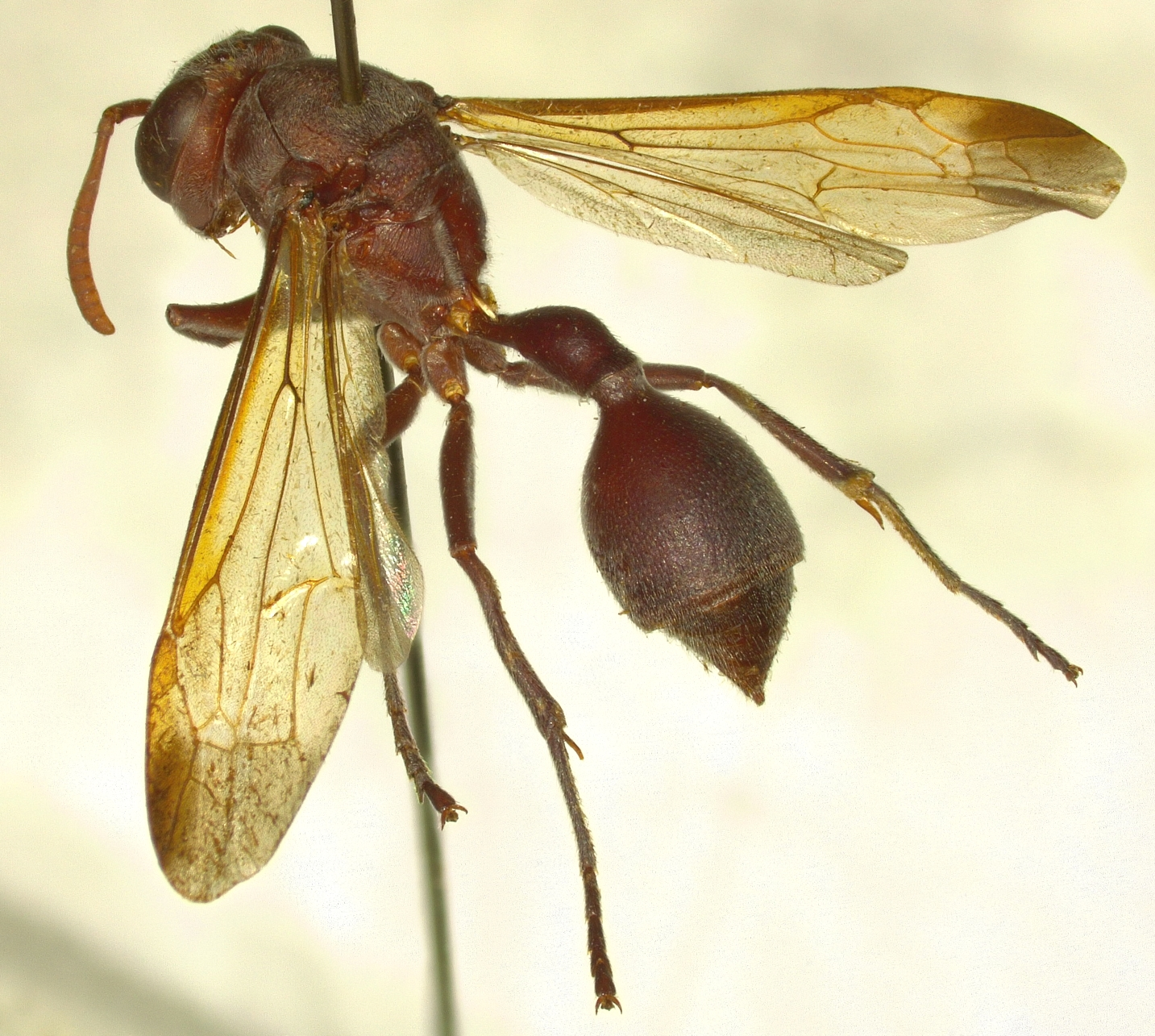
- Holotype, habitus

Scientific classification
- Kingdom: Animalia
- Phylum: Arthropoda
- Clade: Pancrustacea
- Class: Insecta
- Order: Hymenoptera
- Family: Vespidae
- Subfamily: Polistinae
- Tribe: Ropalidiini
- Genus: Ropalidia
- Species: R. mabawa

Binomial name
- Ropalidia mabawa Polašek 2025

= Ropalidia mabawa =

Species of insect

Ropalidia mabawa is an African species of paper wasp, described in 2025, based on a single collected specimen. It represents a special lineage in the African members of this genus, with several unique characteristics. These include apically darkened wing, entirely reddish body, short mesosoma, elongated T1, shallow punctures and striate propodeum. The general appearance resembles another Polistinae genus, Belonogaster. However, the general resemblances with Belonogaster is a case of homoplasy, since second tergum and sternum are completely merged, which is a feature of the genus Ropalidia.

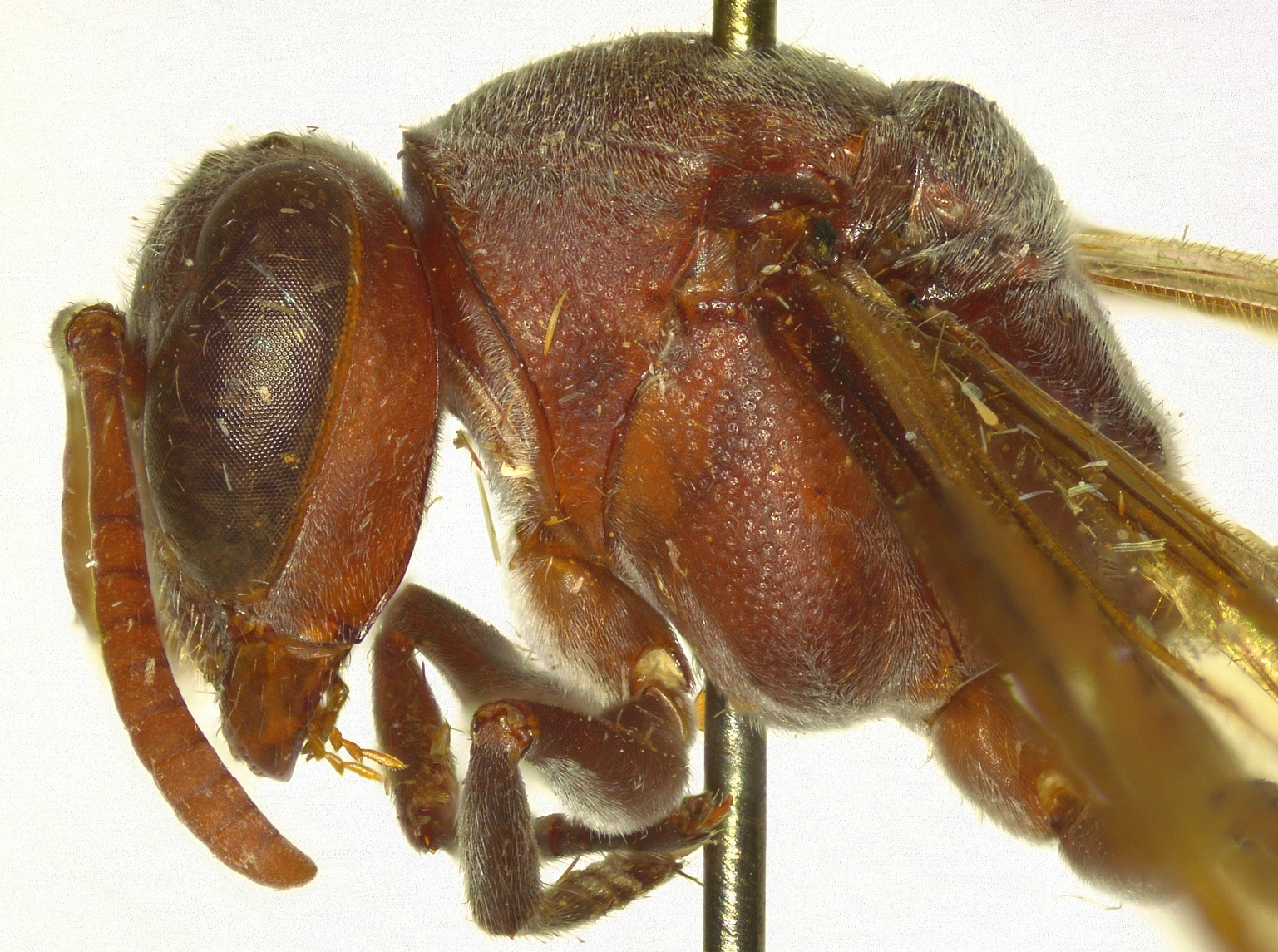
Head and mesosoma, lateral

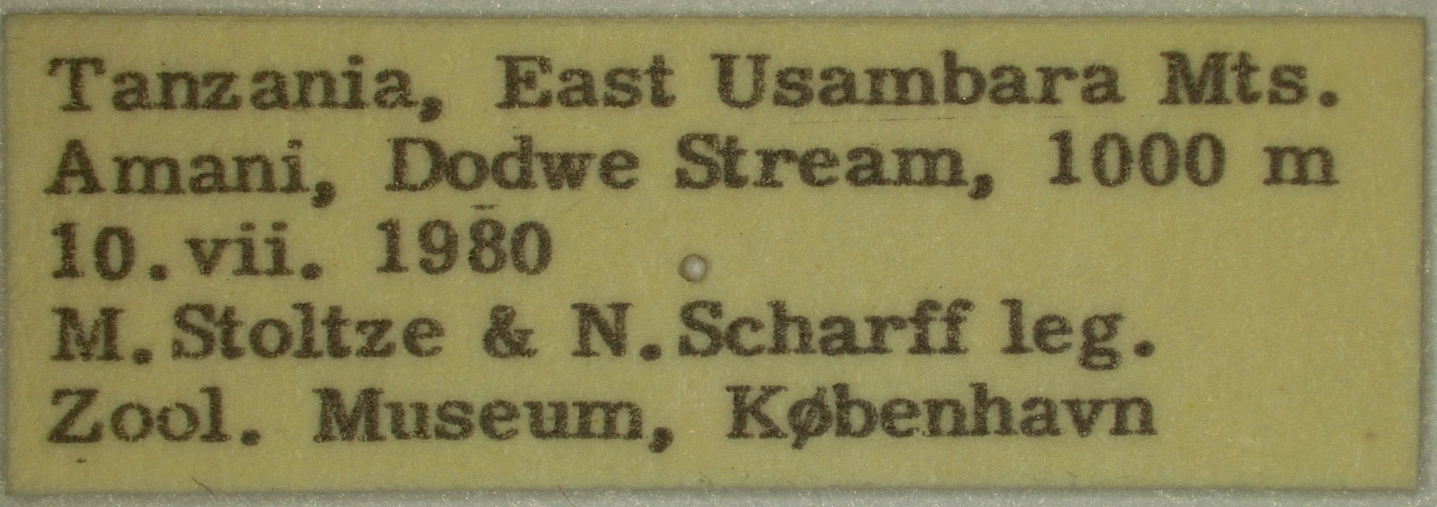
Holotype label

== Distribution ==
This species was only reported from Tanzania, with a single known specimen. Ropalidia distribution map.

== Species description ==
Plazi
