= Ropalidia sumatrae =

Scientific classification
- Kingdom: Animalia
- Phylum: Arthropoda
- Clade: Pancrustacea
- Class: Insecta
- Order: Hymenoptera
- Family: Vespidae
- Subfamily: Polistinae
- Tribe: Ropalidiini
- Genus: Ropalidia
- Species: R. sumatrae

Binomial name
- Ropalidia sumatrae Weber, 1801

Wasp species

Ropalidia sumatrae, the Sumatran paper wasp, is a species of paper wasp in the subfamily Polistinae. It has been recorded in Singapore, Malaysia, Indonesia, Thailand, and Vietnam.
