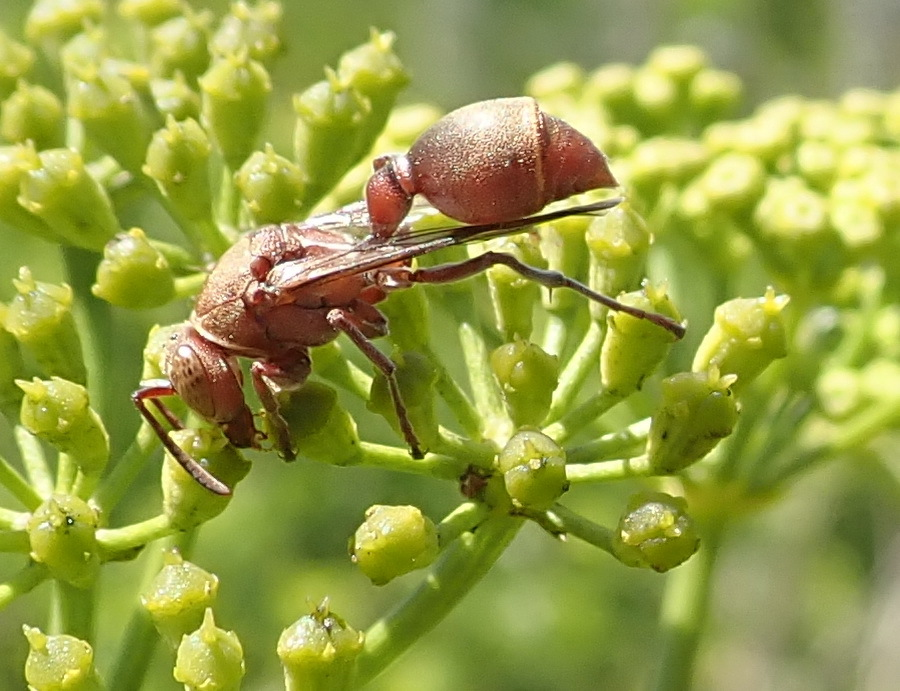
- Ropalidia distigma, South Africa

Scientific classification
- Kingdom: Animalia
- Phylum: Arthropoda
- Clade: Pancrustacea
- Class: Insecta
- Order: Hymenoptera
- Family: Vespidae
- Subfamily: Polistinae
- Tribe: Ropalidiini
- Genus: Ropalidia
- Species: R. distigma

Binomial name
- Ropalidia distigma (Gerstaecker, 1857)

= Ropalidia distigma =

Species of wasps

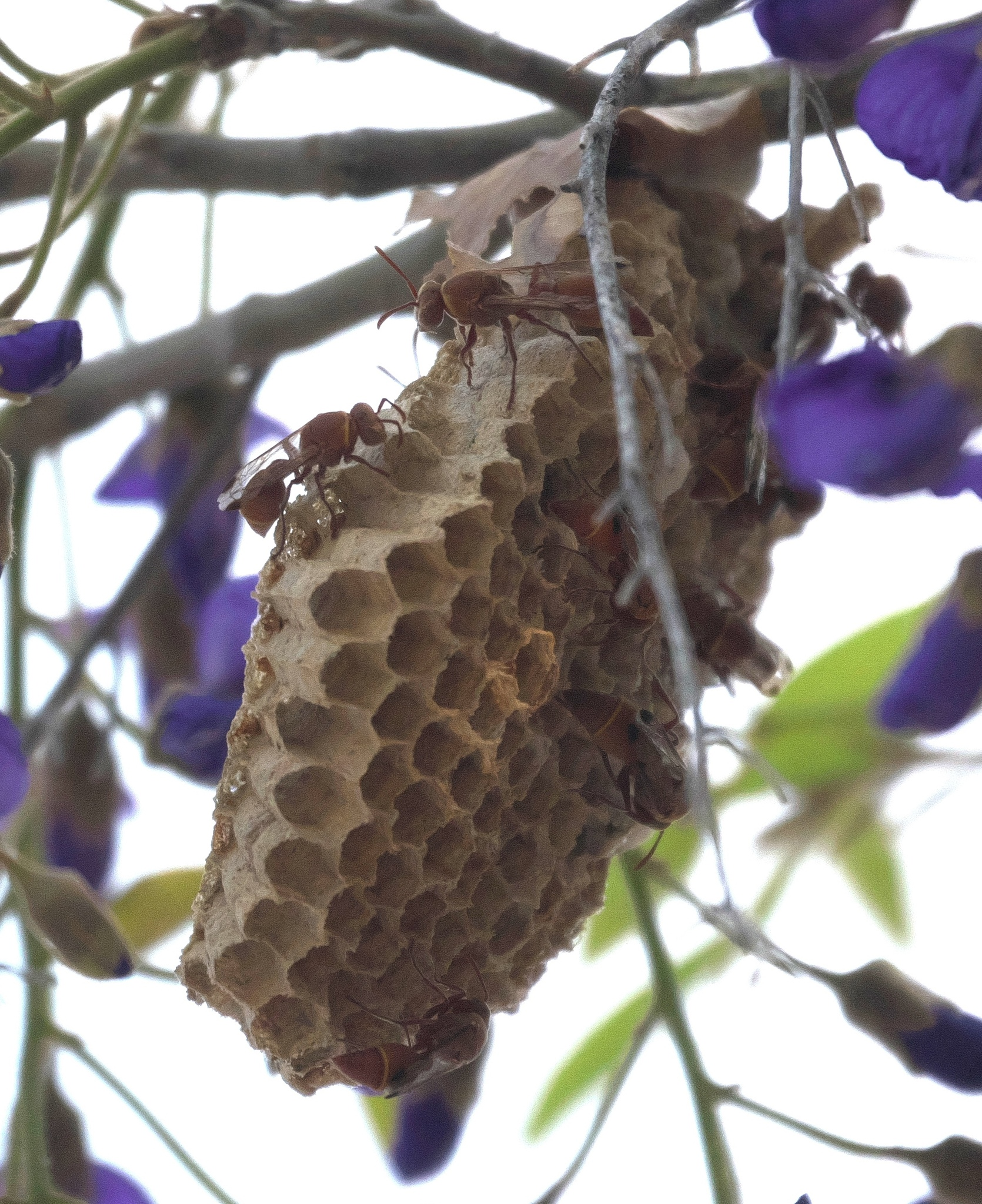
Ropalidia distigma, Namibia

Ropalidia distigma is a species of paper wasp in the family Vespidae. It is found in southern and southeastern Africa.

These wasps construct vertically orientated paper nests with horizontally orientated cells. Wasps of the Polistes genus, on the other hand, construct nests oriented horizontally with the vertically oriented cells.

The wasp larvae are fed soft-bodied insects such as caterpillars.
