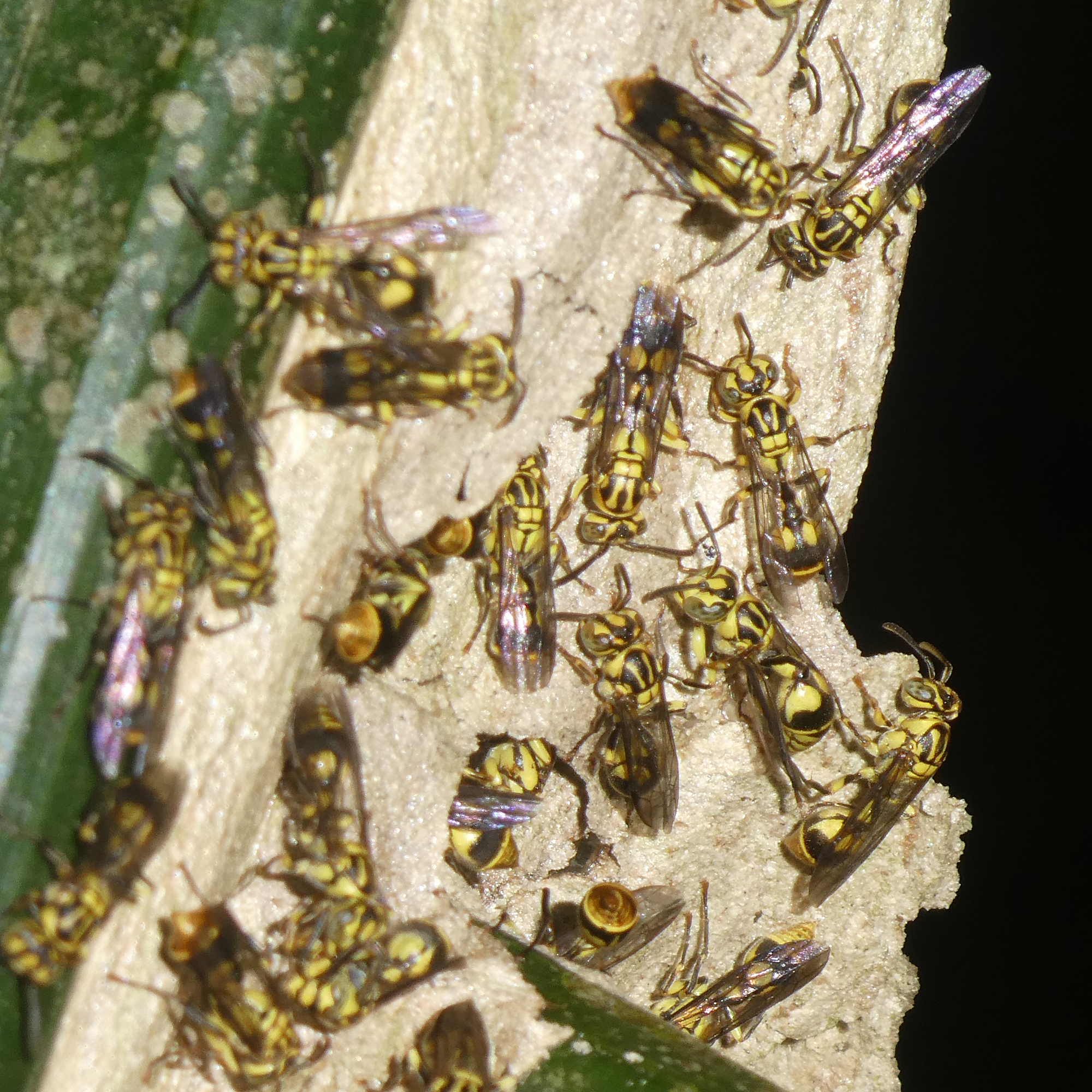
- R. ornaticeps in Cat Tien National Park

Scientific classification
- Kingdom: Animalia
- Phylum: Arthropoda
- Clade: Pancrustacea
- Class: Insecta
- Order: Hymenoptera
- Family: Vespidae
- Subfamily: Polistinae
- Tribe: Ropalidiini
- Genus: Ropalidia
- Species: R. ornaticeps

Binomial name
- Ropalidia ornaticeps (Cameron, 1900)

Synonyms
- Ropalidia ornatipes (Cameron, 1908)

= Ropalidia ornaticeps =

Species of wasp

Ropalidia ornaticeps is an Asian species of paper wasp in the tribe Ropalidiini; no subspecies are listed in the Catalogue of Life. The recorded distribution for this species includes India through to Indochina, including Vietnam; the type specimens are females, taken from the Khasia Hills and deposited in Oxford and London.

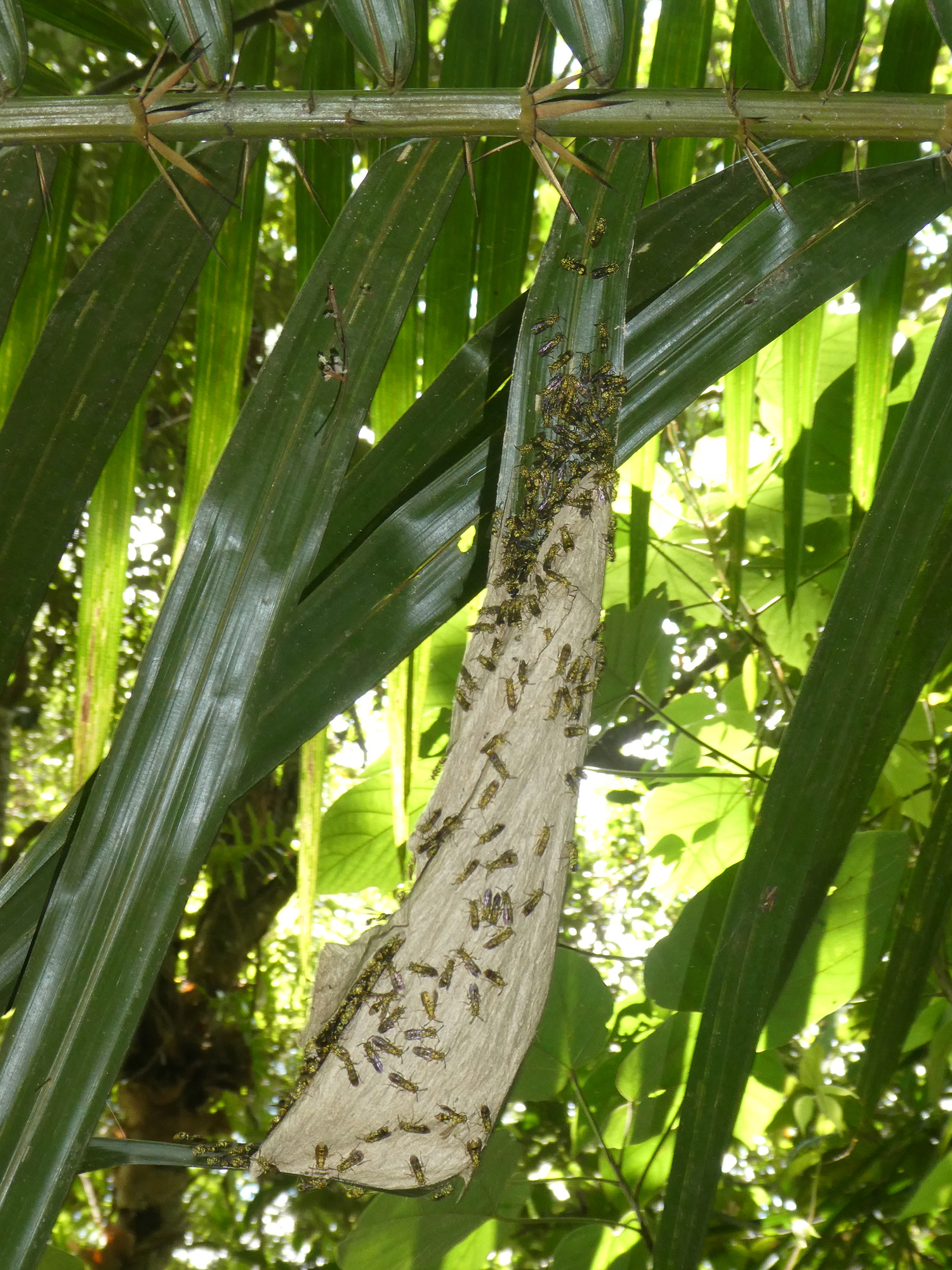
R. ornaticeps nest on frond of Calamus sp.
