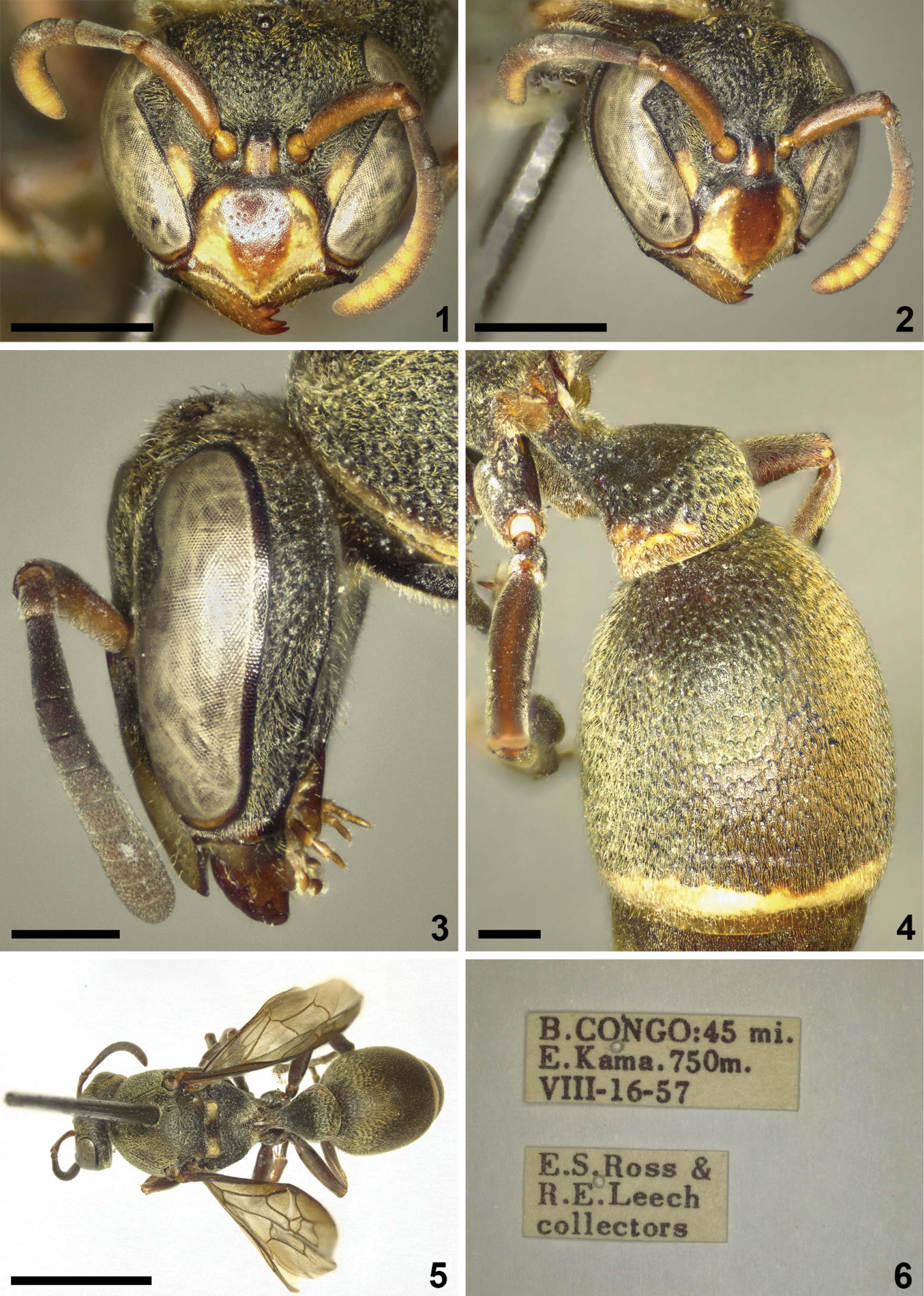
- Female holotype specimen of Ropalidia chromis. Panel 1: frontal head view. Panel 2: Oblique head view. Panel 3: Lateral head view. Panel 4: T1 and T2 lateral view. Panel 5: dorsal habitus view. Panel 6: holotype labels.

Scientific classification
- Kingdom: Animalia
- Phylum: Arthropoda
- Clade: Pancrustacea
- Class: Insecta
- Order: Hymenoptera
- Family: Vespidae
- Genus: Ropalidia
- Species: R. chromis

Binomial name
- Ropalidia chromis Polašek, 2024

= Ropalidia chromis =

Species of wasp

Ropalidia chromis is a species of polistine wasp that belongs to the tribe Ropalidiini. It is native to central Africa in areas such as the DR Congo and the Republic of Congo.

This species has an ambiguous relationship with other members of genus Ropalidia. It has characteristic of both the capensis and non-capensis species groups along with traits that are prevalent in other Polistinae genera with the most notable similarities with Polistes.

== Description ==
The setae and pubescence of the head, mesosoma and metasoma of Ropalidia chromis has a silver-yellow color. This species is similar to African members of the genus Ropalidia following the east–west pattern with darker basal body colour and stronger punctation. Female species has a wingspan of 8.9 mm while males have a wingspan of 8.7 to 9.1 mm.

A single nest was recorded in the Odzala-Kokua region of the Republic of the Congo. It was located on a broad leaf with two adult females located on it. The nest was in the early colony stage with around 13 to 18 cells however it was impossible to define due to a side being obscured.

== Discovery ==
The holotype specimen was collected from the Maniema province of the Democratic Republic of the Congo. It was collected at an elevation of 750 meters. When it was described in 2024, it was done so based on a single female specimen. A male specimen would be described in 2026.

=== Etymology ===
The species name "chromis" is a Latinized form of the word "chrome". This is in reference to the species silvery-yellowish setae and pubescence of the head, mesosoma and metasoma.
