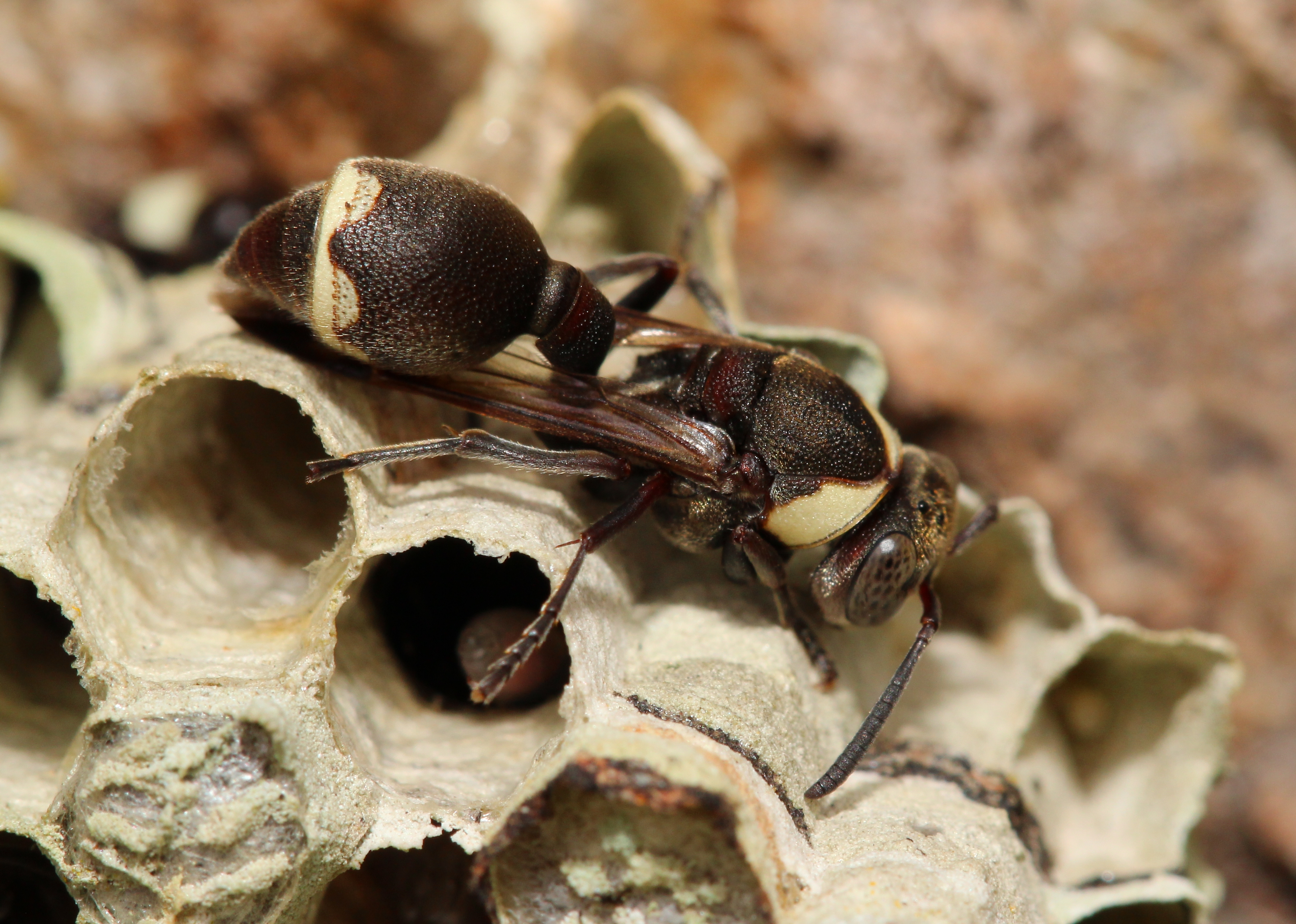

Scientific classification
- Kingdom: Animalia
- Phylum: Arthropoda
- Clade: Pancrustacea
- Class: Insecta
- Order: Hymenoptera
- Family: Vespidae
- Subfamily: Polistinae
- Tribe: Ropalidiini
- Genus: Ropalidia
- Species: R. amabala

Binomial name
- Ropalidia amabala Polašek, Bellingan and van Noort, 2022

= Ropalidia amabala =

Species of insect

Ropalidia amabala is an African species of paper wasp, described in 2022 based on the targeted search for a taxon that was firstly observed in the citizen science platform iNaturalist. The name originates from the Zulu word amabala, meaning "spots", and refers to the six spots integrated with the posterior band on T2 and S2, characteristic for this species. In contrast to other mainland African Ropalidia species, this species builds nests directly on the tree trunks, especially in Brachychiton. The nest-building material is a nearby lichen, which gives a nest greyish colour and blends it perfectly into the surrounding area.

== Distribution ==
This species is distributed in Eastern Cape and KwaZulu-Natal in South Africa. The holotype specimen was collected in Grahamstown.

== Nests ==
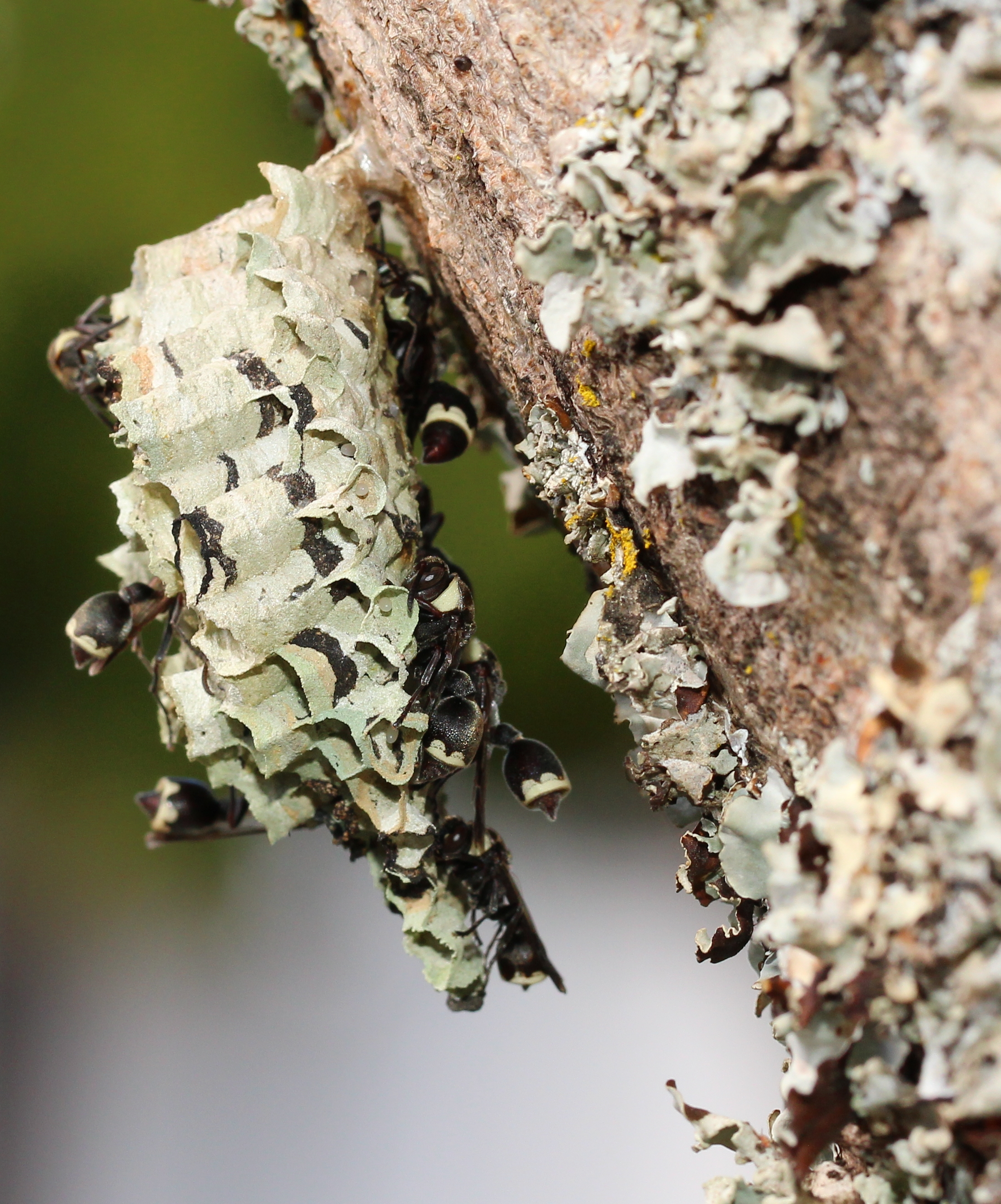
Nest of Ropalidia amabala

The majority of the social wasp nest architecture is considered to have evolved as a countermeasure to the ant predation. However, visual concealment of the nest is considered to reflect selective pressure by visually-driven predators, which are most commonly vertebrates. There are several species from Madagascar that build visually concealed nests directly on three trunks (like R. saussurei Kojima, or R. minor de Saussure), but the phylogenetic comparison suggests that the nesting habits in R. amabala evolved independently. In addition, the blackish basal colour and whitish body markings provide another element of visual concealment, in contrast to more bright Ropalidia species that can be encountered along the Eastern African coast.
