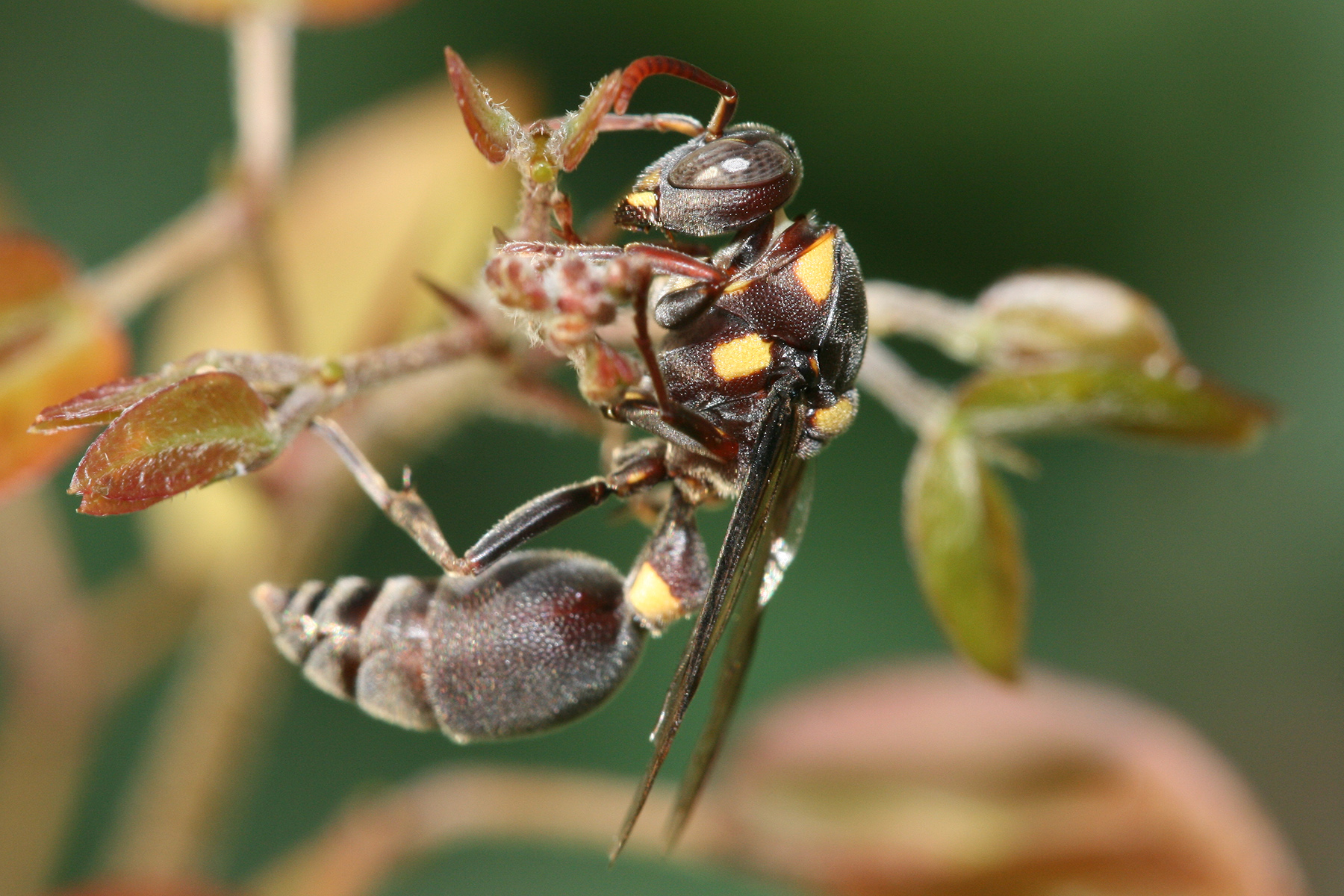
- Ropalidia nobilis

Scientific classification
- Kingdom: Animalia
- Phylum: Arthropoda
- Clade: Pancrustacea
- Class: Insecta
- Order: Hymenoptera
- Family: Vespidae
- Subfamily: Polistinae
- Tribe: Ropalidiini
- Genus: Ropalidia; Guérin-Méneville 1831

Species
- approx. 233 species

Synonyms
- Icaria de Saussure, 1853

= Ropalidia =

Genus of wasps

Ropalidia, also known as small brown paper wasps, is a large genus of eusocial paper wasps (Polistinae) in the tribe Ropalidiini distributed throughout the Afrotropical, Indomalayan and Australasian biogeographical regions. The genus Ropalidia is unusual because it contains both independent and swarm-founding species. Ropalidia romandi is one of the swarm founding species, meaning that new nests are founded by a large group of workers with a smaller number of inseminated females (egg-laying foundresses), while Ropalidia revolutionalis is independent-founding, meaning that each nest is founded by a single foundress.

== Description ==
Ropalidia can be distinguished from other genera in the tribe by: the pronotum having a dorsal carina but lacking a pretegular carina, the first metasomal segment being petiolate but (in dorsal view) not parallel-sided, and the mesepisternum lacking a scrobal sulcus.

== Gallery ==
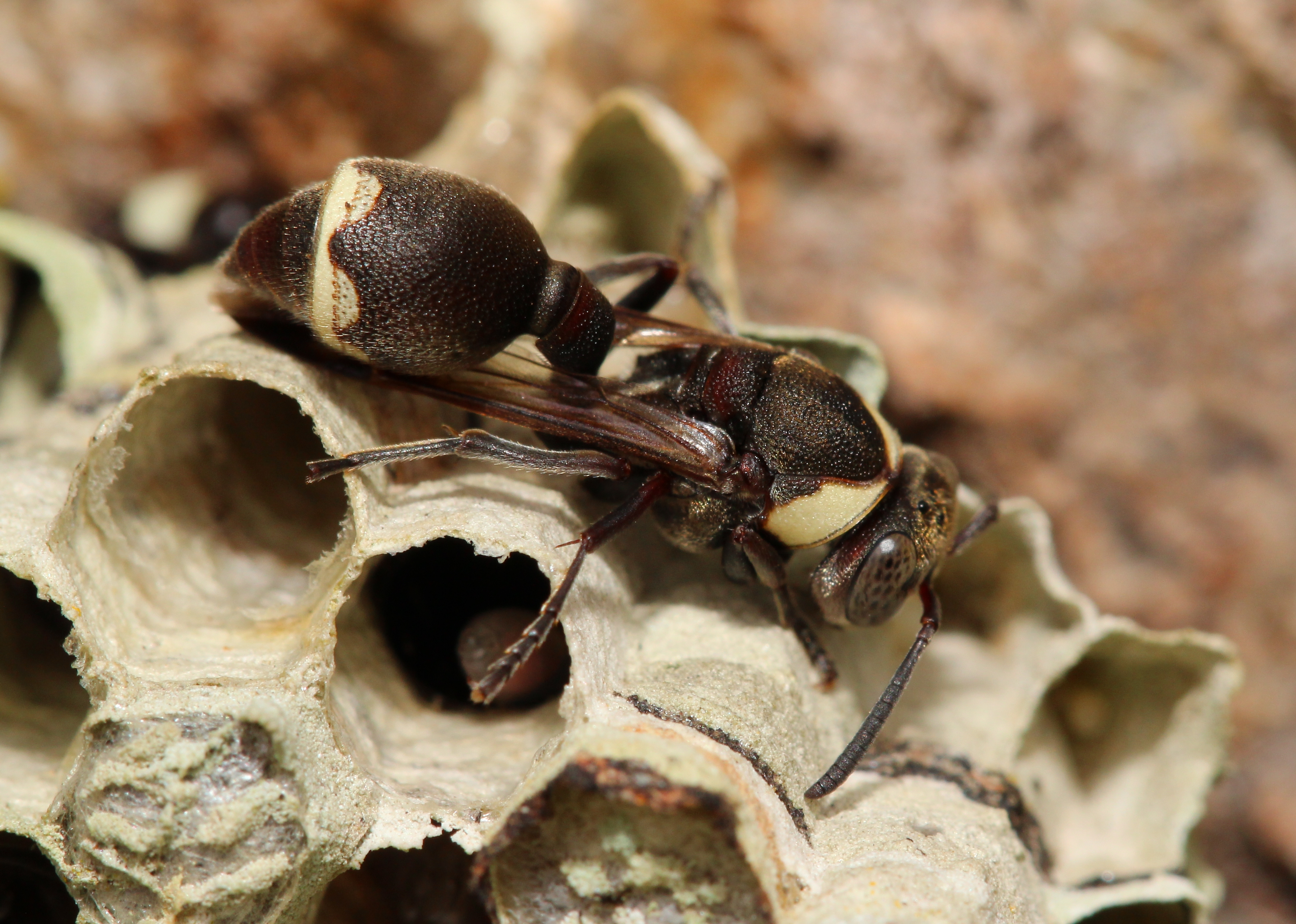
Ropalidia amabala on nest

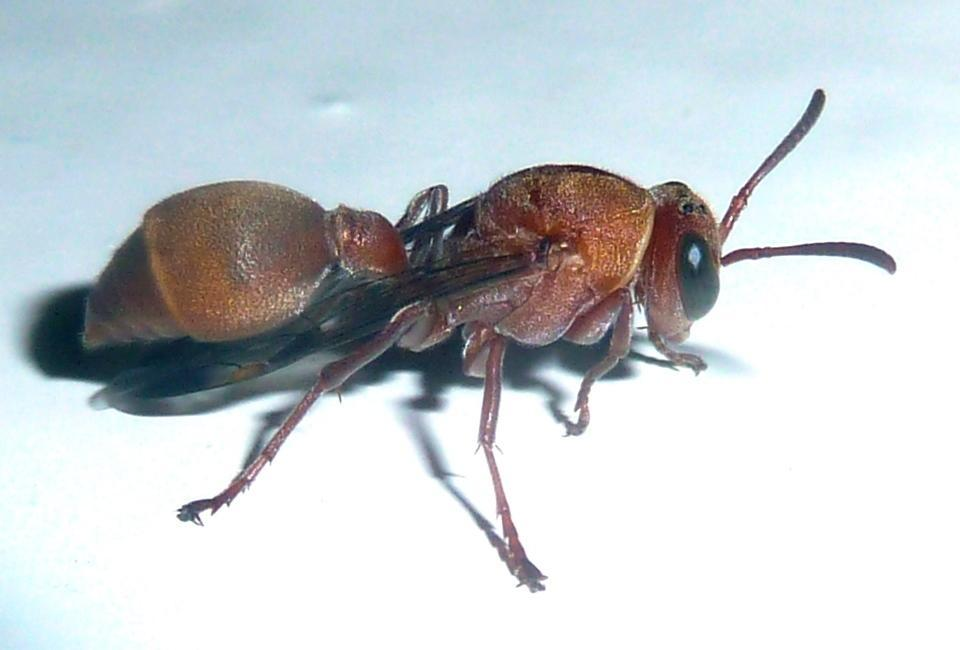
Ropalidia distigma

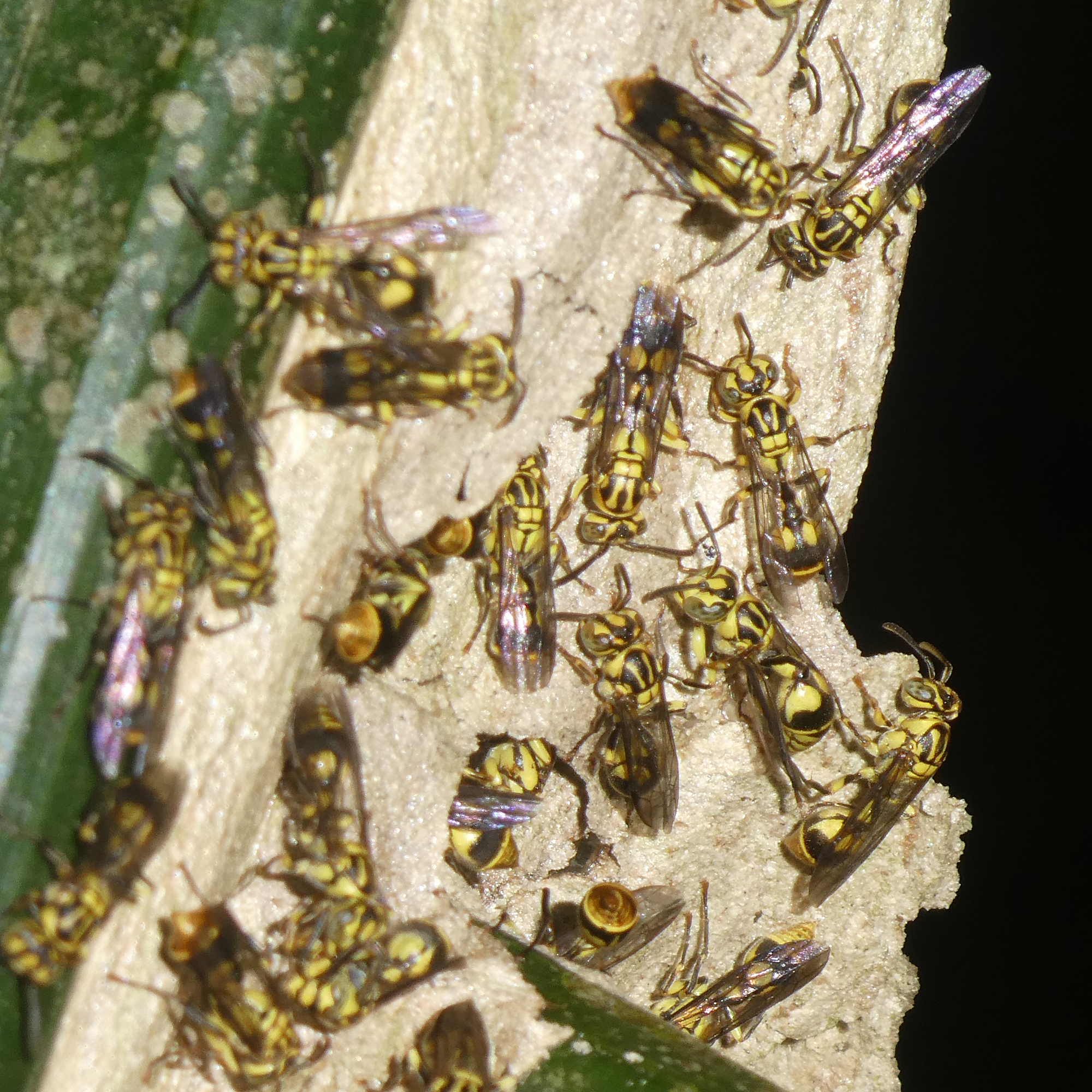
Ropalidia c.f. ornaticeps

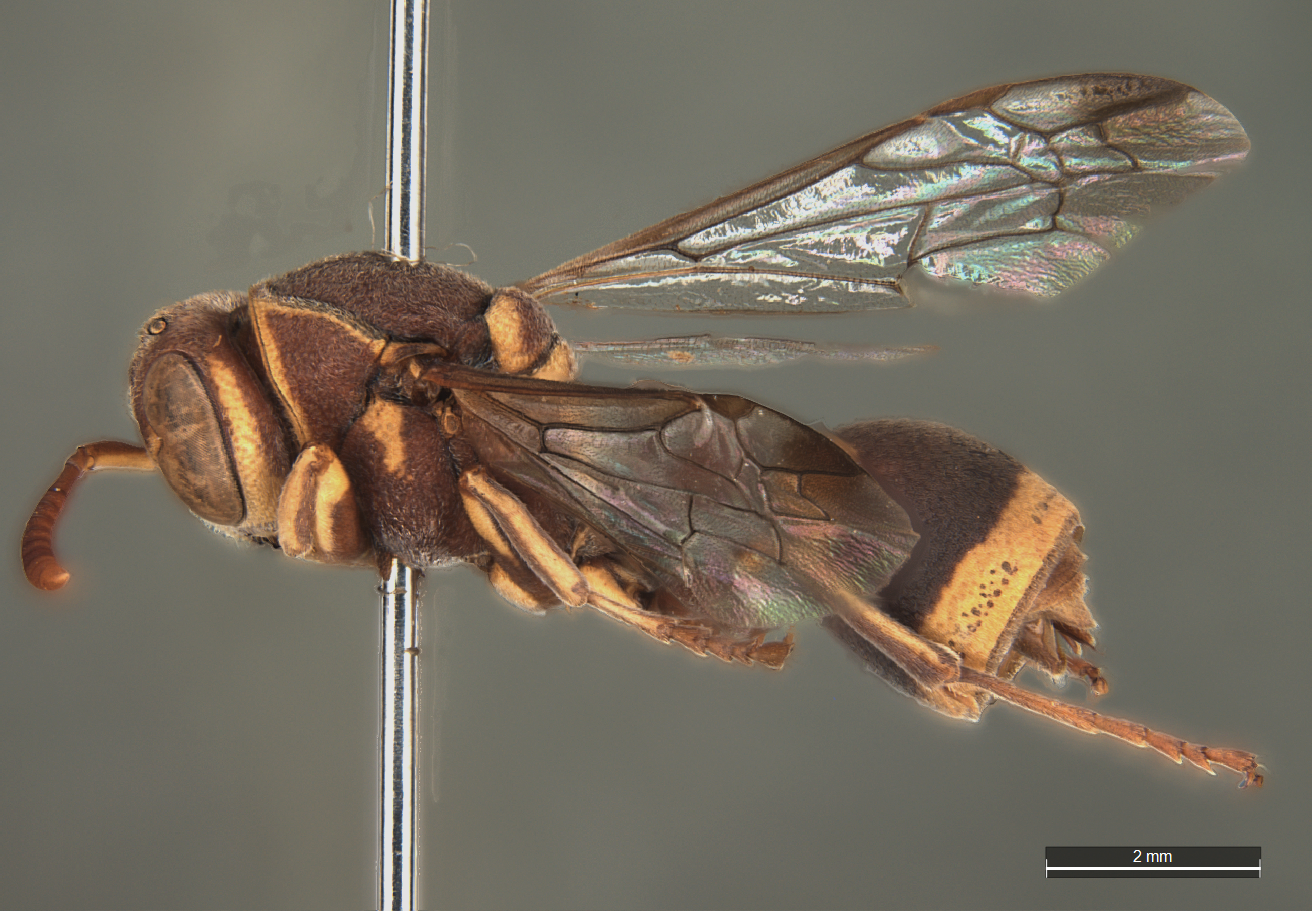
Ropalidia variegata female

== Species ==
There are at least 233 described species of Ropalidia:

- Ropalidia aethiopica (Buysson, 1906)
- Ropalidia albobalteata (Cameron, 1906)
- Ropalidia acuminata Polašek, 2025
- Ropalidia amabala Polašek, Bellingan & van Noort, 2022
- Ropalidia amanhii Polašek, 2025
- Ropalidia anarchica (Saussure, 1853)
- Ropalidia andamanensis Das & Gupta, 1989
- Ropalidia antennata (Saussure, 1890)
- Ropalidia aristocratica (Saussure, 1853)
- Ropalidia artifex (Saussure, 1853)
- Ropalidia atra (Saussure, 1890)
- Ropalidia aulaeum Polašek, 2025
- Ropalidia australis (Saussure, 1854)
- Ropalidia baki Polašek and Onah, 2025
- Ropalidia bambusae Richards, 1978
- Ropalidia barbata Polašek, 2025
- Ropalidia bensoni Richards, 1978
- Ropalidia bicincta (Saussure, 1890)
- Ropalidia bicolor (Smith, 1865)
- Ropalidia bicolorata Vecht, 1962
- Ropalidia bidens Vecht, 1996
- Ropalidia binghami Vecht, 1941
- Ropalidia bipartita Vecht, 1962
- Ropalidia bispinosa (Meade-Waldo, 1912)
- Ropalidia brazzai (Buysson, 1906)
- Ropalidia brevita Das & Gupta, 1989
- Ropalidia brunnea (Smith 1859)
- Ropalidia caesariata Polašek, 2025
- Ropalidia capensis (Saussure, 1862)
- Ropalidia carinata (Saussure, 1890)
- Ropalidia catharinae (Cameron, 1913)
- Ropalidia cauponae Blommers, 2012
- Ropalidia celebensis Vecht, 1941
- Ropalidia chromis Polašek, 2024
- Ropalidia cincinnata Blommers, 2012
- Ropalidia cincta (Lepeletier, 1836)
- Ropalidia clavata (Saussure, 1853)
- Ropalidia clepsydra Polašek, 2025
- Ropalidia clypeata Kojima 1996
- Ropalidia cocoscola Blommers, 2012
- Ropalidia colorata Vecht, 1941
- Ropalidia conservator (Smith, 1860)
- Ropalidia conspicua Smith, 1863
- Ropalidia constitutionalis (Saussure, 1853)
- Ropalidia copelandi Polašek, 2025
- Ropalidia copiaria (Saussure, 1862)
- Ropalidia crassa Vecht, 1941
- Ropalidia crassipunctata Giordani Soika, 1981
- Ropalidia cristata Kojima, 1989
- Ropalidia curvilineata (Cameron 1908)
- Ropalidia cyathiformis (Fabricius, 1804)
- Ropalidia daklak Bui, Mai & Nguyen, 2023
- Ropalidia darwini Richards, 1978
- Ropalidia deceptor (Smith, 1863)
- Ropalidia decorata (Smith 1858)
- Ropalidia deminutiva Cheesman, 1952
- Ropalidia democratica (Saussure, 1853)
- Ropalidia dichroma Vecht, 1941
- Ropalidia dispila (Cameron 1913)
- Ropalidia distigma (Gerst., 1857)
- Ropalidia dondo Polašek, 2025
- Ropalidia ducalis (Saussure, 1900)
- Ropalidia duchaussoyi (Gribodo, 1896)
- Ropalidia eboraca Richards, 1978
- Ropalidia elegantula Richards, 1978
- Ropalidia erythrospila (Cameron, 1908)
- Ropalidia eurostoma Richards 1978
- Ropalidia excavata Giordani Soika, 1977
- Ropalidia extrema Vecht, 1962
- Ropalidia fasciata (Fabricius 1804)
- Ropalidia favulorum Blommers, 2012
- Ropalidia festina (Smith, 1864)
- Ropalidia fita Polašek, 2025
- Ropalidia flavobrunnea Vecht, 1962
- Ropalidia flavopicta (Smith, 1857)
- Ropalidia flavoviridis Kojima, 1988
- Ropalidia fluviatilis (Meade-Waldo, 1912)
- Ropalidia formosa (Saussure, 1854)
- Ropalidia fraterna (Saussure, 1900)
- Ropalidia fulvopruinosa (Cameron, 1906)
- Ropalidia galimatia (Saussure, 1853)
- Ropalidia gemmea Cheesman, 1952
- Ropalidia gracilenta Richards, 1978
- Ropalidia gracilis (Smith, 1859)
- Ropalidia grandidieri (Saussure, 1890)
- Ropalidia granulata Vecht, 1941
- Ropalidia gregaria (Saussure, 1854)
- Ropalidia guttatipennis (Saussure, 1853)
- Ropalidia haladaorum Polašek, 2025
- Ropalidia hastata Polašek, 2025
- Ropalidia hirsuta Richards 1978
- Ropalidia hongkongensis (Saussure, 1854)
- Ropalidia horni Sonan, 1938
- Ropalidia impetuosa (Smith, 1861)
- Ropalidia incurva Cheesman, 1952
- Ropalidia inquieta Cheesman, 1952
- Ropalidia interjecta (Saussure, 1900)
- Ropalidia interrupta Vecht, 1941
- Ropalidia irrequieta (Kohl, 1906)
- Ropalidia irritata (Smith, 1864)
- Ropalidia jacobsoni (Buysson, 1908)
- Ropalidia jaculator (Smith 1871)
- Ropalidia javanica Vecht, 1962
- Ropalidia jemmae Polašek and de Beer, 2023
- Ropalidia kasaragodensis Lambert & Narendran, 2007
- Ropalidia kitui Polašek, 2025
- Ropalidia kojimai Blommers, 2012
- Ropalidia kuficha Polašek, 2025
- Ropalidia kurandae Richards, 1978
- Ropalidia latebalteata (Cameron, 1902)
- Ropalidia latetergum Richards, 1978
- Ropalidia laticincta Vecht, 1962
- Ropalidia lefebvrei Guill., 1841
- Ropalidia leopoldi Bequard, 1932
- Ropalidia lepida Vecht, 1962
- Ropalidia linearecta Blommers, 2012
- Ropalidia longipetiolata (Cameron, 1911)
- Ropalidia loriana (Buysson, 1910)
- Ropalidia luculenta Polašek, 2025
- Ropalidia lugubris (Smith, 1858)
- Ropalidia luzonensis Kojima, 1996
- Ropalidia mabawa Polašek, 2025
- Ropalidia mackayensis Richards, 1978
- Ropalidia macloutsie Polašek, 2025
- Ropalidia maculata (Rad., 1881)
- Ropalidia maculiventris Guerin, 1831
- Ropalidia makore Polašek, 2025
- Ropalidia magnanima Vecht, 1941
- Ropalidia malaisei Vecht, 1962
- Ropalidia malayana (Cameron 1903)
- Ropalidia mangoflava Polašek, 2025
- Ropalidia marginata (Lepeletier, 1836)
- Ropalidia mathematica (Smith, 1861)
- Ropalidia melania Richards, 1978
- Ropalidia merina Blommers, 2012
- Ropalidia mimikae (Meade-Waldo, 1912)
- Ropalidia minor Saussure, 1900
- Ropalidia modesta (Smith, 1858)
- Ropalidia montana Carl 1934
- Ropalidia mosichi Polašek, 2025
- Ropalidia mutabilis Richards, 1978
- Ropalidia mutuntula Polašek, 2026
- Ropalidia mysterica Blommers, 2012
- Ropalidia nigerrima Vecht, 1962
- Ropalidia nigra (Smith 1859)
- Ropalidia nigrescens Vecht, 1962
- Ropalidia nigrior Richards, 1978
- Ropalidia nigrita Das & Gupta, 1989
- Ropalidia nigrofemorata (Cameron, 1910)
- Ropalidia nigrocerasina Polašek, 2025
- Ropalidia nilssoni Giordani Soika, 1991
- Ropalidia nitidula (Saussure, 1890)
- Ropalidia nobilis (Gerst., 1857)
- Ropalidia novaeguinaea (Schulthess, 1913)
- Ropalidia novissima Giordani Soika, 1944
- Ropalidia nubila Polašek, 2025
- Ropalidia nursei Vecht, 1941
- Ropalidia obscura Gusenleitner, 1966
- Ropalidia obscurior Giordani Soika, 1991
- Ropalidia ochracea Vecht, 1962
- Ropalidia ophuzi Polašek, 2025
- Ropalidia opifex Vecht, 1962
- Ropalidia opulenta (Smith, 1857)
- Ropalidia ornaticeps (Cameron, 1900)
- Ropalidia palawana Kojima, 1985
- Ropalidia papuana (Cameron, 1913)
- Ropalidia pendula (Smith, 1857)
- Ropalidia perovici Polašek, 2025
- Ropalidia perplexa Blommers, 2012
- Ropalidia petulans Cheesman, 1952
- Ropalidia phalansterica (Saussure, 1853)
- Ropalidia philippinensis (Saussure, 1854)
- Ropalidia pilosa (Smith, 1859)
- Ropalidia plebeja (Saussure 1862)
- Ropalidia plebeiana Richards, 1978
- Ropalidia politica (Saussure, 1854)
- Ropalidia prasina (Saussure, 1900)
- Ropalidia principalis Kojima, 2001
- Ropalidia proletaria Richards 1978
- Ropalidia pseudomalayana Kojima, 1996
- Ropalidia pulchella (Saussure, 1900)
- Ropalidia ranavali (Saussure, 1890)
- Ropalidia reactionalis (Saussure, 1854)
- Ropalidia regina (Saussure, 1900)
- Ropalidia revolutionalis (Saussure, 1854)
- Ropalidia retromaculata Polašek, 2025
- Ropalidia romandi (Guill., 1841)
- Ropalidia rosae Blommers, 2012
- Ropalidia rufocollaris (Cameron, 1900)
- Ropalidia rufoplagiata (Cameron 1905)
- Ropalidia sakalava (Saussure, 1900)
- Ropalidia salebrosa Polašek, 2025
- Ropalidia sandamara Polašek, 2025
- Ropalidia santoshae Das & Gupta, 1989
- Ropalidia saussurei Kojima, 1998
- Ropalidia schulthessi (Saussure, 1890)
- Ropalidia scitula (Bingham, 1897)
- Ropalidia scottiana (Saussure, 1890)
- Ropalidia sculpturata Gusenleitner, 2001
- Ropalidia semihyalineata (Meade-Waldo, 1912)
- Ropalidia sericea Cameron, 1905
- Ropalidia sexmaculata (Cameron, 1911)
- Ropalidia shestakowi Schulthess, 1931
- Ropalidia socialis (Saussure, 1862)
- Ropalidia socialistica (Saussure, 1854)
- Ropalidia soikae Polašek and Kehinde, 2025
- Ropalidia spatulata Vecht, 1962
- Ropalidia spilostoma (Cameron, 1906)
- Ropalidia stigma (Smith, 1858)
- Ropalidia subclavata (Saussure, 1890)
- Ropalidia sumatrae (Weber, 1801)
- Ropalidia tamila Gusenleitner, 2004
- Ropalidia taiwana Sonan, 1935
- Ropalidia tajiri Polašek, 2025
- Ropalidia tenebrica Polašek, 2025
- Ropalidia tenuipilosa Polašek, 2025
- Ropalidia thailandia Gusenleitner 1994
- Ropalidia timida Vecht, 1962
- Ropalidia tomentosa (Gerst., 1857)
- Ropalidia trichophthalma Richards, 1978
- Ropalidia trimaculata Vecht, 1962
- Ropalidia turneri Richards, 1978
- Ropalidia unicolor (Smith, 1859)
- Ropalidia unidentata Giordani Soika, 1981
- Ropalidia valentula Polašek, 2025
- Ropalidia variabilis (Saussure, 1890)
- Ropalidia variegata (Smith, 1852)
- Ropalidia velutina (Saussure, 1890)
- Ropalidia venustula (Saussure, 1900)
- Ropalidia vietnama Gusenleitner, 1996
- Ropalidia vitripennis (Saussure, 1890)
- Ropalidia wollastoni (Meade-Waldo, 1912)
- Ropalidia zonata (Cameron, 1906)

== Identification ==
- Pictorial key to species of the genus Ropalidia Guérin-Méneville, 1831 (Hymenoptera, Vespidae) from China, with description of one new species
- Vespidae (Hymenoptera) of Vietnam 3: Synoptic key to Vietnamese species of the polistine genus Ropalidia, with notes on taxonomy and distribution
- Taxonomic notes on the paper wasps of the genus Ropalidia in the Indian subcontinent (Hymenoptera: Vespidae)
- Revision of the mainland African species of the Old World social wasp genus Ropalidia Guérin-Méneville 1831 (Hymenoptera; Vespidae)
