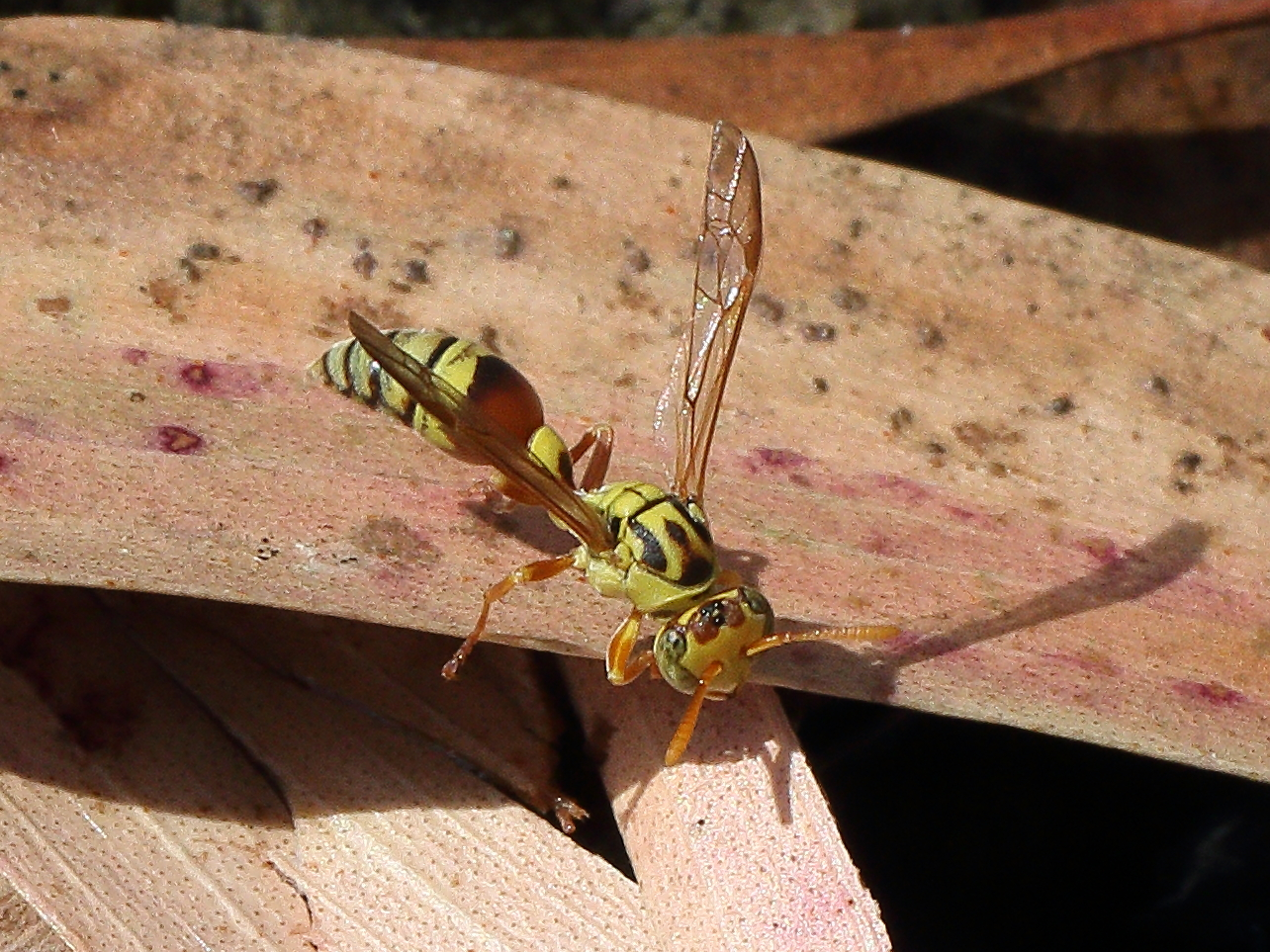
- Burdekin River, Queensland

Scientific classification
- Kingdom: Animalia
- Phylum: Arthropoda
- Clade: Pancrustacea
- Class: Insecta
- Order: Hymenoptera
- Family: Vespidae
- Subfamily: Polistinae
- Tribe: Ropalidiini
- Genus: Ropalidia
- Species: R. romandi

Binomial name
- Ropalidia romandi (Le Guillou, 1841)

= Ropalidia romandi =

Yellow Brown Paper Wasp

Species of wasp

Ropalidia romandi, also known as the yellow brown paper wasp or the yellow paper wasp. (Note: Not to be confused with Polistes flavus, Polistes olivaceus, or Polistes wattii.) is a species of paper wasp found in Northern and Eastern Australia. R. romandi is a swarm-founding wasp, and manages perennial nests. Its nests are known as "paper bag nests" and have different architectural structures, depending on the substrates from which they are built. The specific name honors Gustave, baron de Romand, a prominent French political figure and amateur entomologist.

Because swarm-founding colonies can contain more than one egg-laying queen, they tend to challenge current kin selection theory. in that they do not meet William D. Hamilton’s rule of haplodiploid eusocial Hymenoptera, in which all the sisters from a single mating of one queen with a parthenogenetically-produced male will share 75% of their genes. This wasp often has multiple strepsipteran endoparasites.

== Taxonomy and phylogeny ==
Ropalidia romandi, first named by Élie Jean François Le Guillou in 1841, is in the subfamily Polistinae. It contains two subspecies, R. romandi romandi (Le Guillou 1841) and R. romandi cabeti (de Saussure 1853). Ropalidia is the only genus in Polistinae that contains both independent-founding species, founded by only one or a few fertilized females, and swarm-founding species. Swarm-founding species within Ropalidia must thus have evolved independently from swarm-founding species found in other polistine genera. This genus is distributed across Oceania and the Old World, and contains approximately 180 species. It and the other three Old World polistine genera form a monophyletic group.

== Description ==
Wasp morphology

Ropalidia romandi is distinct among Australian paper wasps for its overall yellow color, with dark brown markings on its thorax and abdomen. R. romandi is a small paper wasp at 6.0-7.0 mm. The first segment of the abdomen in Ropalidia is narrower than the following segments. R. romandi's front wings fold lengthwise when resting, which is a common characteristic of paper wasps.

Its nest is referred to as "paper bag nest" because it consists of a papery envelope covering several horizontal combs. Both the envelope and its contents are made of papery plant fibers glued together with saliva. The nest is either spherical or hemispherical in shape, can be up to one meter long, and is usually found in trees or eaves of buildings.

== Distribution and habitat ==
In Australia R. romandi is found in Northern Territory and Queensland. It is one of the most common paper wasp species in Eastern Queensland. R. romandi lives in both tropical and temperate climates. However, their habitats are prone to cold winters, which results in seasonal colony activity. Nests can be found hanging from the underside of various tree branches and building eaves at anywhere from 2.3m to 30m above the ground. They commonly attach their nests to Eucalypts, which shed their bark frequently. When this occurs, the nests fall to the ground and are abandoned by the colony. Shortly after, a new nest is constructed.

== Colony cycle ==
R. romandi is a swarm-founding species, which means its colonies are founded by a swarm of workers associating with queens (fertilized females). This is in contrast to what happens in independent-founding species, where the colony is founded by only one or a few fertilized females. R. romandi has been found to manage perennial nests that can last a few years. This means that the colony does not die off in the winter as they do in annual colonies, but they instead survive the winter and manage the same nest the following season. Because of this, swarm-founding species normally have larger colonies with more queens than independent-founding species. Colony survival over the winter is thought to be possible because R. romandi practices seasonal colony activity. This means that in summer, the wasps are more active, performing active reproduction, while in the winter the number of reproductives dies off, and no reproductive activity is observed.

There is also a difference in colony foraging behavior between the winter and summer seasons. Workers can be seen foraging for flower nectar (which is rich in carbohydrates) much more frequently in the winter than in the summer, suggesting that the wasps use these carbohydrates as energy stores to survive the winter. These energy stores make it possible for the wasps to not take any active flights for up to a week, which is beneficial because they avoid the cool temperatures and often rainy weather.

During R. romandi's colony cycle, there is a large difference in the composition of the cells within the nest. Winter nests have more nectar deposits in cells than larva. In contrast, summer nests have only 1% of their cells filled with nectar, while the rest contain developing immatures. This again points to the seasonal colony activity of R. romandi with more reproductive activity, and therefore brood raising, occurring in the summer, and more foraging behavior and nectar storing occurring during the winter.

== Swarm-founding ==
The genus Ropalidia is unique because it contains both independent and swarm-founding species. R. romandi is a swarm founding species, meaning that new nests are founded by a large group of workers with a smaller number of inseminated females (egg-laying queens). There are two different types of swarms: reproductive and absconding. A reproductive swarm is made up of some females of an already established colony, who depart to form a new colony with a group of workers. On the other hand, absconding swarms, a continuation of the existing colony, are made up of all the members of a colony. R. romandi is thought to utilize both forms of swarming, however, not much is known about reproductive swarming in Ropalidia and most research on R. romandi has been on absconding swarms. It has been found that R. romandi will abscond if their nest is destroyed, damaged, or continually disturbed.

=== Absconding process ===
During the absconding process, the workers, rather than the queen, choose the new nesting site, behaviour characteristic of independent founding species. It has been hypothesized that the process is mediated by pheromones. During their search for a new nesting site, R. romandi workers have been observed to exhibit a behavior called ‘metasomal dragging’. This means that the wasp drags its metasome or gaster, the second abdominal segment and sections posterior to it, along objects on which it lands. These objects are usually leaves, rocks, or man made structures. There are glands on the underside of the gaster that leave a scent behind for the other workers and the queens to follow. Wasps that didn't exhibit metasomal dragging can often be seen inspecting objects with their antennae, presumably following the scent trail. This pheromone path helps recruit all other members of the colony to the new nesting site. Visual information may also be very important during the R. romandi absconding process, and may even be the ultimate signal identifying the new nesting site. As wasps continue to make their way to the new nesting site, they can be seen orienting themselves to aerial swarms that had formed around the new site. This orientation to aerial swarms has been observed in the absence of continued metasomal dragging as well, leading to the hypothesis that the visual cue of the aerial swarm is the indication of the final nesting site.

=== Aggressiveness during swarming ===
R. romandi, along with other swarm-founding wasps, can be quite aggressive during the swarming process. They are aggressive towards humans, non-nestmates, and to each other. Aggressiveness towards humans may result in stings, while aggressiveness towards other wasps involves biting of the body, legs or wings. Workers are more often the aggressors, while queens are more often the victims. In R. romandi, workers do not always act out against non-nestmates. If different colonies of R. romandi are introduced to each other during the absconding process, they will cluster together and relatively little violence is exhibited against non-nestmate queens at this stage. If a queen is introduced after new colony formation, however, she will be vigorously attacked. It has been hypothesized that this means that R. romandi workers test out different queens during the absconding process.

== Genetic relatedness in colonies ==
Because swarm-founding colonies can contain more than one egg-laying queen, they tend to challenge the kin selection theory and typically do not meet Hamilton's rule of haplodiploid species mentioned in the introduction. In comparison to other swarm-founding species, these theories are challenged further in R. romandi. R. romandi colonies are extremely large, and can have an average of up to 400 queens at any one time. The average for other swarm-founding species is only around 20 queens. Having such a large number of queens decreases the genetic relatedness within the nest. Workers in R. romandi have a genetic relatedness of only 0.16, and queens have a genetic relatedness of only 0.34. The next lowest genetic relatedness among a swarm founding species is found in Polybia emaciata 's 0.24 among workers and 0.55 among queens. These numbers indicate a large deviation from Hamilton's ¾ rule. Independent-founding species, with fewer queens, are much more likely to be more genetically related.

It has also been suggested that R. romandi practices cyclical oligogyny, which is a phenomenon where new queens are made when the number of queens is reduced. This was hypothesized because a difference was found between the number of effective queens in a colony, and the mean number of queens.

== Morphological caste differences ==
It has been found that R. romandi queens and workers differ in size and body shape, however these differences vary between colonies and are sometimes insignificant. If worker-queen dimorphism is present, the largest observable difference is between the metasome, with queens having larger metasoma, and longer and more reddish second metasomal segments. The most significant difference between queens and workers is between the developmental condition of their ovaries. Queens have ovaries in which all ovarioles have mature or semi mature oocytes, and they show sequential development of oocytes. Workers, on the other hand, have ovarioles that are filamentous or have only partially developed oocytes. Some individuals have ovaries that are between the queen and worker stages. These wasps are thought to be workers that become egg laying during swarming events, or they may be young uninseminated queens.

== Parasites ==
A common endoparasite of R. romandi are insects of the order Strepsiperans, commonly in the family Stylopidae. Strepsipteran females are permanent endoparasites that dissolve through the cuticle of the host as larvae, create a sac from the host tissue to protect themselves from host's defenses, and then reside in the abdomen of the host, occupying up to 80% of the volume of the abdomen. These parasites can cause sterility, sometimes causing ovaries and spermathecae to become unrecognizable, and often change the host morphology and behavior. However, they do not kill their host, and it has even been suggested that they can prolong their host's life. R. romandi often has multiple stylopisation, meaning they carry more than one Stylopid endoparasite at a time.

Additionally, R. romandi broods can be attacked by hornets. The hornets take larvae from the nest, sometimes over a period of just days, sometimes over weeks. It has been hypothesized that the envelope of a nest functions to reduce exposure to parasites.

== Nest development ==
Consisting of a papery envelope covering several horizontal combs, R. romandi nests are referred to as "paper bag nests" because they are made of plant fibers glued together with saliva to form a dry papery substance. The nests can be up to one meter long and are usually off the ground in trees or eaves of buildings. To begin building a nest, a number of wasps gather at the nesting site, and begin building several combs simultaneously. This simultaneous building leads to semi-spiral shape within the nest because irregular connections are made when the combs are connected at their growth fronts. The envelope is either constructed after the construction of the first few combs or during that process; the timing of envelope construction depends on swarm size, and nest location. More combs are then added, and the envelope is then completed to cover all combs. The number of entrance holes depends on nest size. R. romandi never builds double sided combs and the number of cells in each comb varies. The cells are all of similar size, indicating that size dimorphism is insignificant in R. romandi colonies.

=== Solid surface nest architecture ===
R. romandi nests are often built under the eaves of buildings. When built on such a hard surface, the nest, entirely covered by an envelope, forms a compressed hemisphere with multiple horizontal, flat combs, the largest comb being near the bottom. These combs are connected to each other within the envelope by ribbon-like pedicels. Cells are hexagonal and regularly arranged. The envelope is mostly single layered, however it can be double layered in parts. It is made of plant fibers and fragments and is a uniform light gray color. It is possible for the envelope to be heavily coated in saliva to the extent that the fibrous material of the envelope itself is completely hidden. A round entrance hole is at the bottom of the hemispherical nest.

=== Variable surface nest architecture ===
When nests are also found built among the branches of various trees, the architecture of the nest is changed because of the substrate to which it has to attach. The most noticeable difference is that R. romandi nests connected to branches are spherical rather than hemispherical and mostly double-layered, with only a few single-layered sections. The envelope is not a gray color, but instead a creamy brown, suggesting differences in the plants available to construct the nest. The saliva coating of the envelope is thicker when built in trees, suggesting that the thickness of the coat might be related to the rain exposure of the nest location. Instead of a roof, the nests often use leaves from the tree, incorporated into the envelope, to cover the top of the nest. The number of combs in a branch-built nest is almost double that of one built on a solid surface, however they are much more irregular in shape and arrangement.

== Human importance ==
R. romandi is most aggressive if they are swarming, if their nests are disturbed, or if the wasps feel their nest is threatened. If wasps feel threatened, they may swarm out of the nest, pursue the aggressor, and sting repeatedly.

Because R. romandi nests can often be found on buildings, it is common for wasp nests to be built in heavily human populated areas. Attempting to knock them down induces aggression, and R. romandi tend to rebuild nests in similar spots. Additionally, paper wasps feed their young on caterpillars, so they can help eliminate common garden and agricultural pests.

== Diet ==
Paper wasps such as R. romandi are known to feed their young on caterpillars. Additionally, they feed on the nectar of many flowering trees, including Syzygium cormiflorum and Acacia oraria. Flower nectar foraging behavior increases during the Austral winter, and is thought to be due to the fact that the high carbohydrate level of flower nectar allows the colony to survive the winter. R. romandi shows another interesting activity in the winter: they are seen foraging for honeydew from scale insects. They have been observed defending and protecting the scale insects against other wasps.
