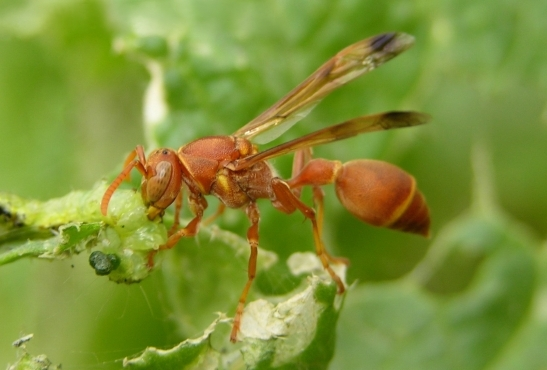

Scientific classification
- Kingdom: Animalia
- Phylum: Arthropoda
- Clade: Pancrustacea
- Class: Insecta
- Order: Hymenoptera
- Family: Vespidae
- Subfamily: Polistinae
- Tribe: Ropalidiini
- Genus: Ropalidia
- Species: R. marginata

Binomial name
- Ropalidia marginata le Peletier, 1836

Subspecies
- Ropalidia marginata jucunda; Ropalidia marginata marginata; Ropalidia marginata rufitarsis; Ropalidia marginata sundaica

= Ropalidia marginata =

Species of insect

Ropalidia marginata is an Old World species of paper wasp. It is primitively eusocial, not showing the same bias in brood care seen in other social insects with greater asymmetry in relatedness. The species employs a variety of colony founding strategies, sometimes with single founders and sometimes in groups of variable number. The queen does not use physical dominance to control workers; there is evidence of pheromones being used to suppress other female workers from overtaking queenship.

== Taxonomy and phylogeny ==
R. marginata was originally described by Johan Christian Fabricius in 1793 under the name Vespa ferruginea, but that name was previously applied to a different species, so the oldest available name for the species was given by Amédée Louis Michel le Peletier in 1836. One of its subspecies, R. marginata jocund from New Guinea and Australia, was described in 1898, and two others, R. marginata rufitarsis from Myanmar and R. marginata sundaica from Indonesia and the Malay Peninsula, were described in 1941. R. marginata is an insect, having six legs. It is in the order Hymenoptera, containing wasps, ants and bees. It is in the family Vespidae, with wasps, yellow jackets, and hornets. It is in the subfamily Polistinae, containing eusocial wasps and it is in the tribe Ropalidiini. On the Indian subcontinent, there are 22 recognized species of the genus Ropalidia. The species R. travancorica, once thought separate, was determined synonymous with R. marginata after intensive specimen comparisons in 1989. R. marginata is most closely related to R. spatulata and R. brevita. The male antenna and genitalia are similar between R. brevita and R. marginata.

== Description ==
R. marginata are a dark reddish color (slightly lighter than Ropalidia revolutionalis), with yellow spots on some joints and a yellow ring around the lower abdomen. Males differ from females by having a weaker mandible and lacking a stinger. The female workers are not morphologically different from the queen and are more distinguishable by behavior.

=== Females ===
Females are hard to distinguish morphologically except for their level of ovary development, which generally increases with their age. Females are the default workers of R. marginata, but they may also rise to queenship by taking over a resident queen, founding a new colony, or adopting an abandoned one.

==== Workers ====
Female workers forage to feed themselves and non-foragers, such as the queen, larvae, and males. They help to build the nest and care for the larvae. Workers regulate the foraging levels within the colony through aggression, and are a good example of self regulation in insect societies. Workers may mate with males and remain inseminated even if they are never able to attain queenship and produce offspring. Worker-worker relatedness is not asymmetrically higher than relatedness between workers and males or workers and the queen. This is because of overlapping matrilines and patrilines within the colony which decreases relatedness overall between individuals.

==== Potential queens ====
When a queen is lost, a worker has the ability to take her place. The mechanism by which the next-in-line-queen is chosen is cryptic; neither age nor dominance accurately predicts the successor. The potential queen may or may not be inseminated or have developed ovaries. The only certainty is that after the queen is gone, the worker who is the potential queen will become very aggressive. The aggressiveness subsides after about two days. The potential queen seems to require this heightened aggression in order to boost her own development.

==== Queens ====
Primitively eusocial societies are typically headed by behaviourally aggressive queens, who use aggression to suppress worker reproduction. However, the queen in R. marginata is a "docile sitter" who does not use physical aggression to maintain her reproductive monopoly in the colony. The queens are suspected to control workers through pheromones. She uses these pheromones to signal her presence and fecundity to her workers, who perceive these signals and refrain from reproducing. The tenure length, age, and productivity of a queen vary greatly on a case-by-case basis.

The exact mechanisms by which the queen is recognized by her colony are not fully understood. One possibility is that there are chemicals in the queen's Dufour's glands that signal her queen status and influence workers who are on the nest with those chemicals. A potential queen who is acting aggressively can be experimentally subdued by applying the old queen's Dufour's gland's chemicals to the nest.

The queen interacts with her workers primarily through chemical communication; physical interactions between the queen and workers do not serve a communicative function. She does not regulate worker behaviors such as foraging and nest matienance.

=== Males ===
Males are produced less frequently and in less quantity than females are produced. After eclosion males remain on the nest for up to a week. Upon leaving, they live nomadically and mate with females of other nests. Males do not assist in any of the colony maintenance activities while they reside in the nest. They are not well suited for foraging or defending the colony because of their weaker mandibles and lack of a stinger. They are dependent on female workers feeding them and are sometimes observed to cannibalize nest larvae. It has been experimentally demonstrated that males of R. marginata have the ability to feed larvae, but they do not because they lack food access and females do not give them an opportunity to do so in natural populations.

=== Nests ===
R. marginata makes gymnodomous nests with up to 500 cells and up to 10 pedicels. The nests are made of paper, which are produced by wasps masticating cellulose and mixing it with saliva. The nests are usually found in closed spaces with small openings in natural and man-made structures.

Nest of Ropalidia marginata

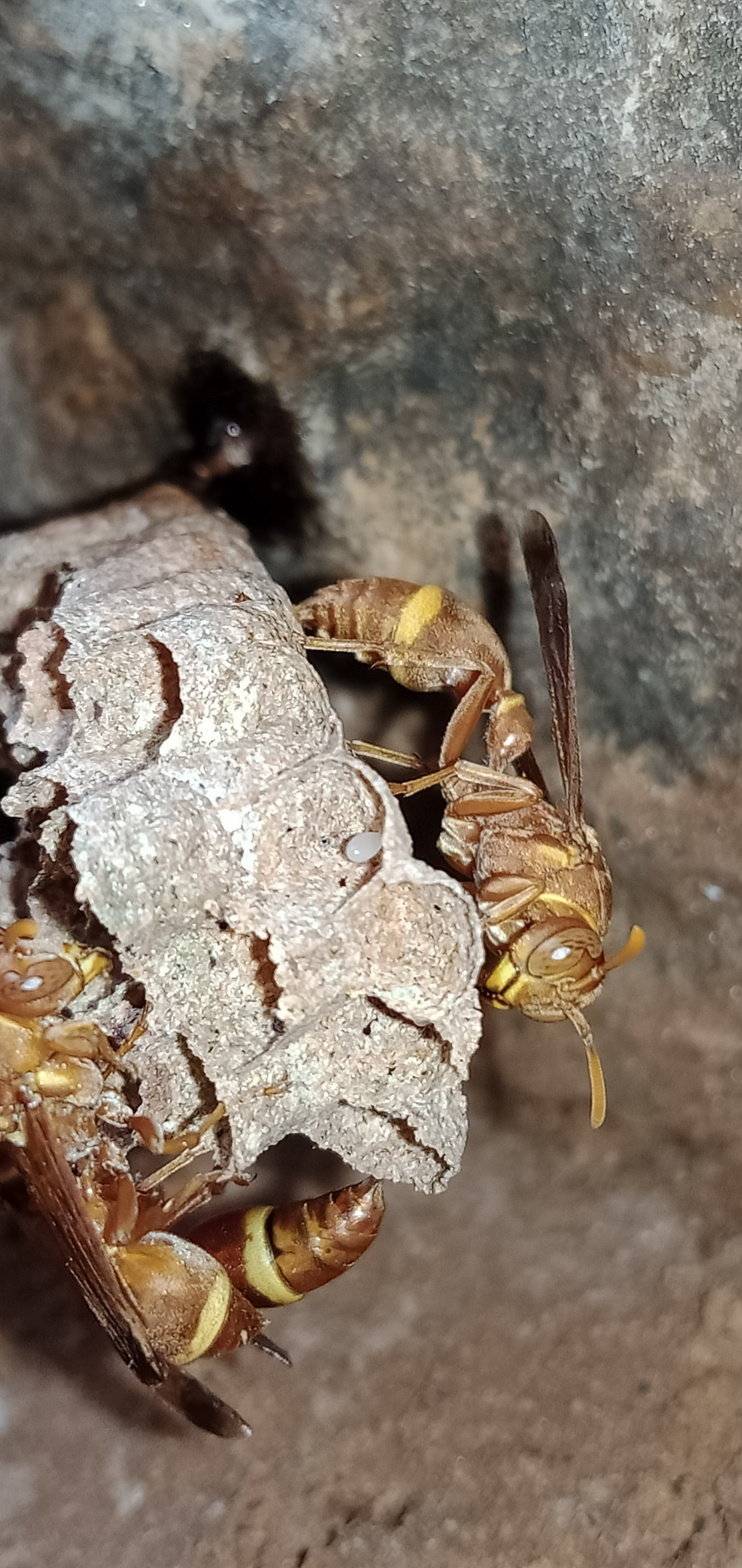
Foundress and an egg By Dulneth Wijewardana

== Distribution ==
The distribution of R. marginata extends as far west as Pakistan and as far east as New Guinea, Queensland, and some eastern Pacific islands. They are the most common social wasp in India. Although R. marginata has been studied extensively in India, there is a lack of literature about the animal in other parts of its range.

== Colony cycle ==
In India, Ropalidia marginata has an aseasonal, indeterminate and perennial colony cycle, which means that nest initiation starts throughout the year, and nests are active throughout the year. Colonies are started more frequently from May to July when food is abundant and less frequently from December to February when temperatures are colder. Each colony has one reproductive female, a queen, and that position can be taken by adopting an abandoned nest, taking over queenship at an existing nest, or starting a new nest alone or with other foundresses.

=== Brood development ===
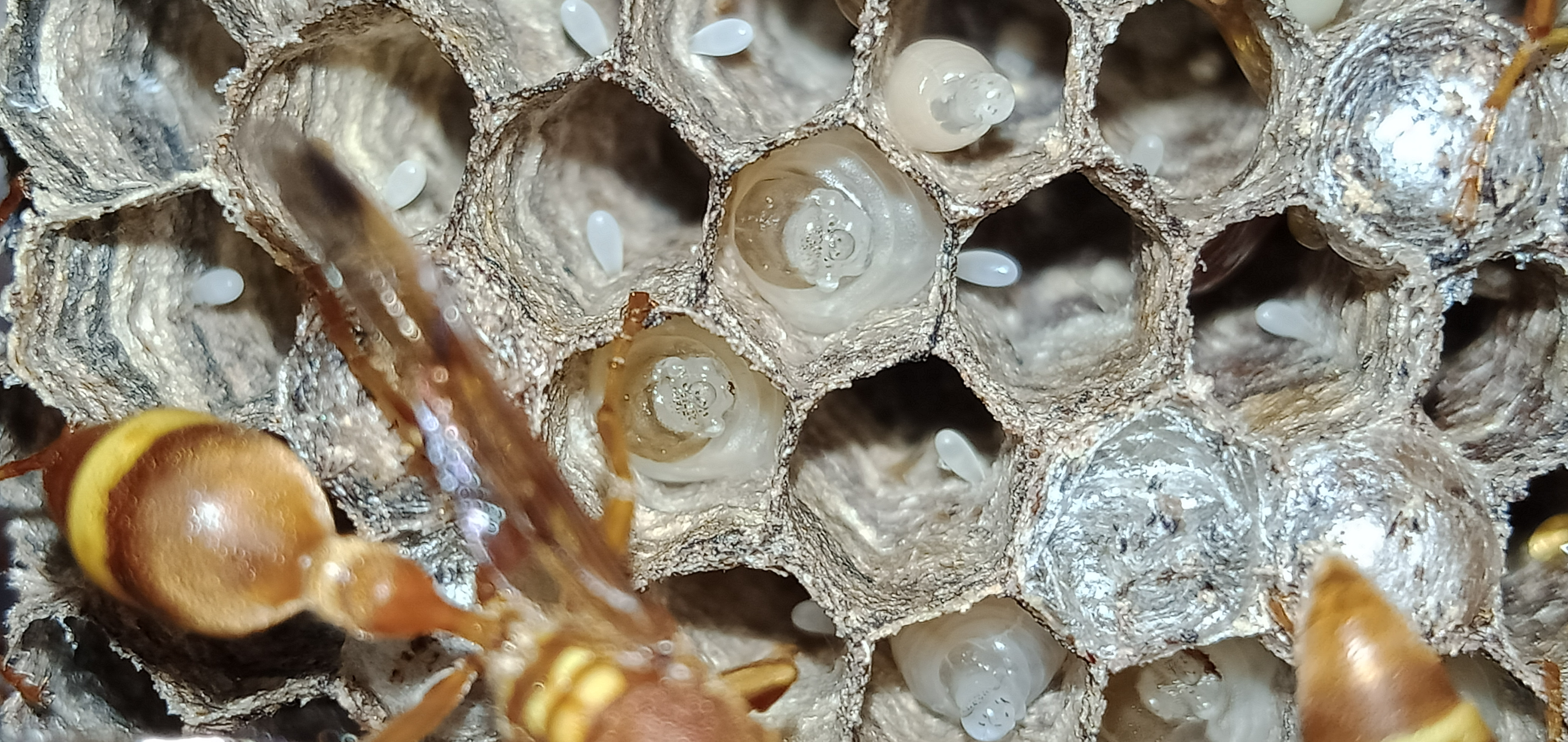
Larva and eggs

The amount of time it takes for a brood to fully develop is highly variable and is complicated by occurrences of nest cannibalism, which is often undetected as replacement eggs appear. Males leave the nest 2–7 days after eclosion. Tenure on the nest for a worker female is more variable. Their residence time ranges from 1–60 days.

=== Foundress variation ===
Colonies can be started by as many as 20 foundresses, but most frequently they are started with four or less. Studies on wild and captive populations indicate that it is most common for colonies to start with three or more foundresses, rather than two foundresses; single foundress colonies are the least common. Although the multiple foundress colonies were less likely to fail, all colonies, regardless of number of foundresses, had the same per capita productivity. Only one individual acts as an egg layer in each colony.

- Single Foundress colonies

If there is only a single foundress, she will work alone to build the nest and care for larva until they reach adulthood. The adult offspring will help her rear future broods. Single-foundresses produce much less offspring, average of two, than the queen of a multiple-foundress colony, and in many cases a single foundress colony fails before any of the brood reach adulthood.

- Multiple Foundress colonies

Of the females in multiple foundress colonies, only one takes the role of queen and is the sole egg layer. The others work on the nest and care for the brood. Multiple foundress colonies do not have a greater per capita production rate but do have greater productivity overall compared to single-foundress colonies. It is suspected that competing interests of taking care of the queen's brood (indirect fitness) and seeking queenship and the chance to reproduce (individual fitness) prevent the efficiency that would lead to higher productivity in multi-foundress groups. Colonies with more than one founder are more likely to survive overall, which may be why individuals migrate into them more frequently than starting single-foundress colonies, even when the chances of taking over the role of queen are lower.

=== Switching colonies ===
Individuals may migrate from their birth or founded colony to take up residence in another. This is most common during the pre-emergence phase and when there are around forty to fifty adults on the home nest. Migrant wasps are more likely to be accepted while they are younger, which is generally less than six days old. Age has been shown to be the determining factor for whether the resident wasps react with hostility or tolerance. Age might be an indicator of ovarian development (reproductive threat) or of other important qualities such as plasticity for role specialization. Multiple-foundress colonies are preferentially selected by migrant wasps, despite the fact that individuals are more successful at becoming a queen in a single-foundress colony. Young migrants become fully integrated into the new colony, becoming foragers and sometimes taking over the role of queen.

=== Colony adoption ===
In some cases, all adult wasps will be absent from a nest when a migrant finds it. Females sometimes adopt these abandoned nests and take over queenship in variable numbers of foundresses. This has been observed to be more common in predator-protected vespiaries than in the field.

== Behavior ==
=== Larval feeding ===
Females feed larvae by masticating acquired solid food for three to four minutes before feeding it to the larvae. She feeds about two larvae the solid food and then grooms herself. Then she feeds six larvae with a liquid of regurgitated food and grooms herself again. Females also engage in behaviors such as fanning wings, antennal drumming, and body jerks which are sometimes synchronous between many females. These behaviors are expected to be related to adult/larval communication. Female feeding behavior is more complicated than that of males, who do not use liquid food or this set of behaviors.

==== Male feeding behavior ====
Males have been experimentally shown to be capable of deliberately delivering food to larvae when females are absent and food surplus is available. Males feed the larvae with the same proportion of individuals as females. They are, however much less efficient than females at feeding. They spend over 90% of feeding bouts masticating and end up feeding far fewer larvae. The males also preferentially feed the largest larvae, resulting in the death of many smaller and younger larvae. It was only possible to observe this behavior by removing all females from a nest and hand feeding the males, as the males cannot forage on their own and have no opportunity to care for larvae if females occupy this role. While males are typically not responsible for feeding larvae in naturally occurring populations, they are capable of doing so.

=== Aggression ===
Aggression in the form of chasing and sometimes stinging is needed to defend the nests from predators and non-nestmates. Older females from different nests are chased away, as are predators such as Vespa tropica. Dominance relationships, mediated by aggression, control foraging amidst workers. Aggressive behavior is a crucial part of the transition from worker to queen.

=== Dominance ===
Behaviorally dominant queens are standard among other primitively eusocial wasps, but in R. marginata, it is the workers who engage in subordinate-dominant behavior. Among the workers, the dominance hierarchy does not relate to reproductive competition or accurately predict individuals to take over queenship. Worker dominant-subordinate interactions seem to regulate foraging behavior. This is supported by the fact that dominance is received more by foragers and that frequency of received dominance correlates with foraging rate. It has been experimentally shown that dominance frequency is related with hunger of the colony, suggesting that dominance interactions are a system of peer regulation to support the survival of the colony.

=== Recognition ===
Nestmates act tolerantly towards their fellow nestmates, which can still be recognized after days of isolation. Ropalidia marginata can distinguish nestmates from non-nestmates, and react aggressively to non-nestmates that are older, while younger foreigners may be accepted into the colony. Discriminating nestmates from non-nestmates is dependent on acquiring and encountering odors from the nest post-eclosion. Individuals removed from a nest before eclosion will not recognize, or be recognized by, members of that nest. There is no indication that there is any recognition based on genetic relatedness.

=== Foraging ===
These predatory wasps are solitary foragers (that means each forager finds the prey, kills it and brings that back to the nest all alone). Foragers typically forage within about 300 to 700 m from their nests, though if food is scarce, they can travel up to about 1.5 km from their nest. With experience, they acquire a vivid familiarity with their foraging range; they perhaps remember the sites from where they have collected food previously. Such familiarity with the foraging landscape eventually helps them to reduce their search for food.

== Mating system ==
The haplodiploid genetic system creates asymmetry in relatedness of most Hymenoptera species. R. marginata, however, have increasingly unrelated workers and broods because of "simultaneous production of several different patrilines and matrilines within a colony." Serial polygyny works against the inclusive fitness benefits workers have of caring for broods because of reduced relatedness.

Gadagkar devised a unified model that makes predictions about what proportion of the population of R. marginata "should opt for a selfish solitary nesting strategy and what proportion should opt for an altruistic worker strategy" (853). From this, he was able to predict that 5% should opt for the selfish solitary nesting strategy while 95% should opt for the altruistic worker strategy.

Gadagkar et al. genotyped R. marginata mothers and daughters at a "few non-specific esterase loci" to infer the genotypes of the haploid fathers or estimate the number of fathers needed to produce the daughters observed (850). The researchers ultimately found, "R. marginata queens mate with 1–3 different males and the average relatedness among their daughters thus drops from the theoretically expected 0.75 to about 0.50, thus entirely negating the advantage of haplodiploidy for social evolution, as predicted by Hamilton" (851). Gadagkar "found no evidence for intra-colony kin recognition" (851).

=== Mate choice ===
To avoid inbreeding, most taxa recognize kin and do not consider them in mate selection. R. marginata however show no indication of discriminating against nestmates for mate choice in both males and females. Because males disperse and live nomadically after leaving the nest and breeding does not occur on the nest, inbreeding is relatively unlikely in this species even without the anti-incest behavior. Body size is arbitrary in mate choice for both males and females of this species.

=== Serial polygyny ===
Colonies of R. marginata often outlive the queens; workers may serve different queens throughout their lifetimes. This creates overlapping matrilines within the colony where workers end up caring for the brood of different mothers, yet again decreasing the relatedness amidst workers.

== Predation ==
Vespa tropica, a hornet species, is a key predator of R. marginata brood in Indian populations. As a predator avoidance strategy, nests are often built to only be accessible through small openings, thus, preventing hornets from getting through.

== Other sources ==
- Das, B. P. and Gupta, V. K. (1989). "The social wasps of India and the adjacent countries (Hymenoptera: Vespidae)". Gainesville, Fla: The Association for the Study of Oriental Insects.
- Gadagkar, R. (1991). "Belonogaster, Mischocyttarus, Parapolybia, and Independent founding Ropalidia., In: The Social Biology of Wasps. (ed.) K. G. Ross and R. W. Matthews pp. 149–187. Ithaca and London: Cornell University Press.
