= Gustave de Romand =

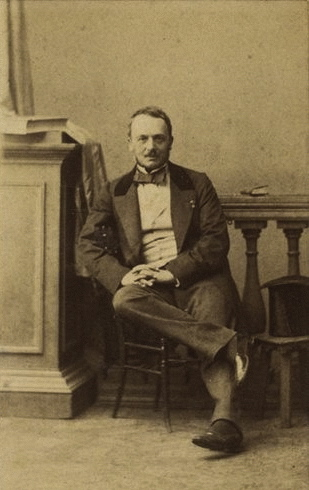
Gustave, baron de Romand, photographed by André-Adolphe-Eugène Disdéri

Gustave du Bois, baron de Romand (1810–1871) was a respected amateur French entomologist, a member of the Société entomologique de France. who was prominent in the political arena. He contributed on September 4, 1837, a "Description of the male Epomidiopteron Julii." to the Royal Entomological Society of London, but his modest place in the history of entomology is secured by his Tableau de l'aile supérieure des Hyménoptêres (privately printed in Paris, 1838). In a hand-colored lithograph it presented 28 kinds of Hymenopteran upper wings, their homologous features differently tinted, so that by comparing them the viewer could establish to which family an individual specimen belonged. In an accompanying printed 14-column table, the terms used by previous entomologists to describe Hymnopteran wings are tabulated.are presented for comparison. The Australian paper wasp Ropalidia romandi was named by Élie Jean François Le Guillou to honour him in 1841.

M. de Roland was more widely known among his contemporaries as a conservative politician, author of the political essay De l'État des partis en France (1839), and of an essay on the dictatorial political strength of radical, socialist Paris over the provinces (De la dictature de Paris sur la France) in the year of revolution, 1848. The crisis of 1848 elicited from him several other pamphlets. He was a member of the Corps législatif under the Second Empire (1852-1870). He published his Souvenirs politiques et administratifs in 1855. His father, aide-de-camp of the prince de Polignac and a staunch royalist during the Hundred Days was ennobled by Louis XVIII at the second Bourbon restoration, 1815, and was made a member of the Legion of Honor.

He married the only daughter of General Paisi Kaïsarov and adopted in 1860 the double surname "du Bois de Romand-Kaïsaroff".
