= Ropalidia plebeiana =

Scientific classification
- Kingdom: Animalia
- Phylum: Arthropoda
- Clade: Pancrustacea
- Class: Insecta
- Order: Hymenoptera
- Family: Vespidae
- Subfamily: Polistinae
- Tribe: Ropalidiini
- Genus: Ropalidia
- Species: R. plebeiana

Binomial name
- Ropalidia plebeiana (Richards, 1978)

Species of wasp

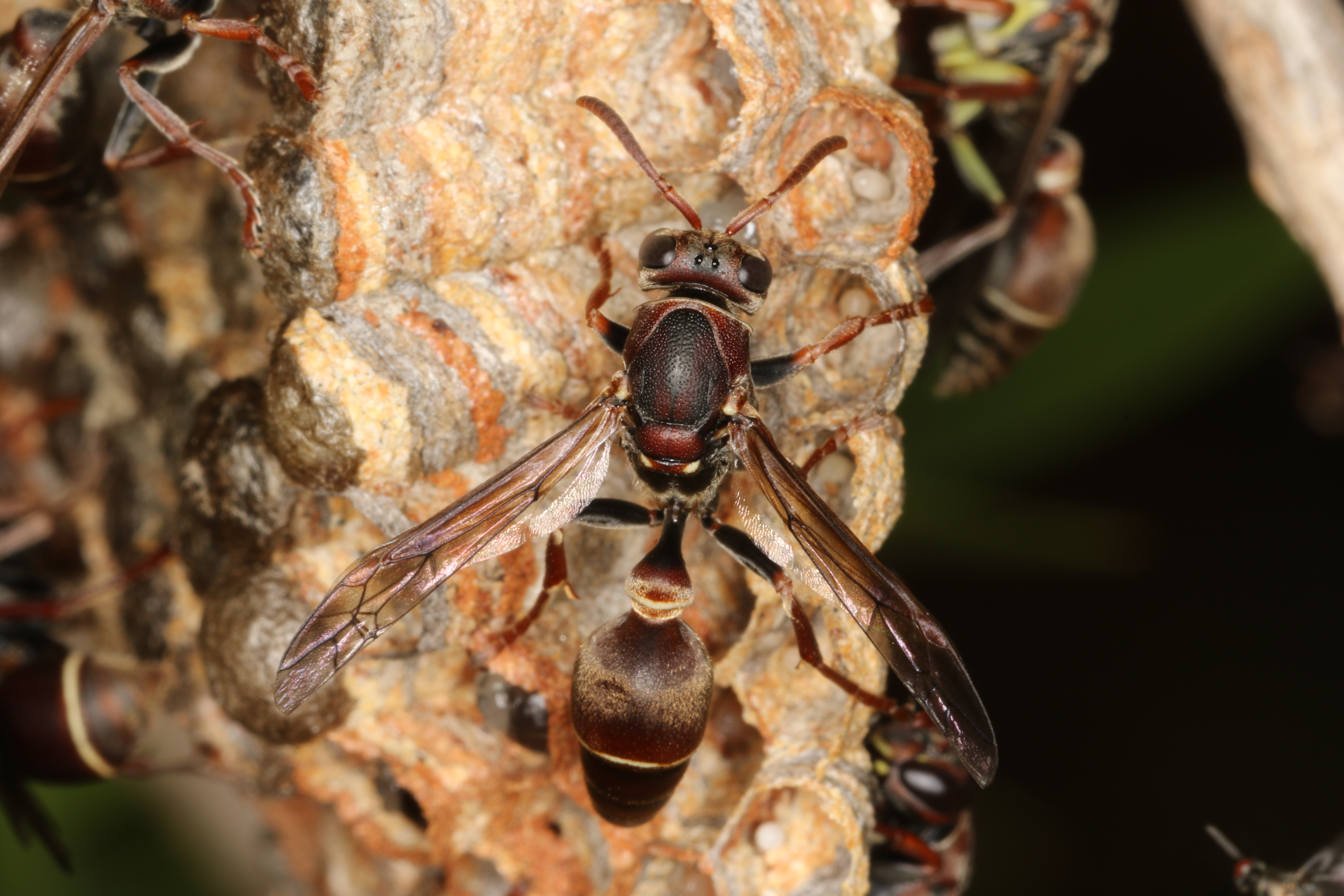
Ropalidia plebeiana

Ropalidia plebeiana is a eusocial temperate paper wasp. It is unique, as it is the only temperate wasp in the typically tropical Ropalidia genus. R. plebeiana is widely distributed in eastern Australia, and recently have been found making huge nest aggregations, with thousands of nests on trunks of trees, in south-eastern New South Wales.

== Taxonomy and phylogeny ==
R. plebeiana is in the Vespidae family along with thousands of other wasp species. The genus, Ropalidia, is typically made up of wasps that live in tropical locations, but R. plebeiana is the exception. The genus, Ropalidia is classified as brown paper wasps. Although R. plebeiana does not yet have a place within the taxonomy of the Ropalidia family, it has been discovered to be closely related to R. proletaria.

== Description and identification ==
R. plebeiana is a white-faced, brown paper wasp. It is a medium-size paper wasp, with a reddish-brown-colored body. There are small, thin white rings on its shoulders, waist, and abdomen.

Nests of R. plebeiana are seen as a horizontal single comb with an irregular shape, and they are grayish brown in color. Nests have been found to have 1–3 males and anywhere from 13 to 28 females. R. plebeiana nests have been found to have about 40 cells, which have transparent windows, with about 20 larvae and eggs at any point. The central cells of the nest are where the cocoons and larvae are found, and these cells are usually longer than the peripheral cells that contain eggs. The nests are seen to congregate in central areas in a “city” type atmosphere. Cooperation has been witnessed between different nest combs, and each separate nest comb is occupied by a single colony.

== Distribution and habitat ==
R. plebeiana is widely distributed in Australia. It is found mainly in New South Wales and the Capital Territory, but they are also found in southern Queensland. Brisbane is generally considered to be the northern boundary of the species distribution. However, R. plebeiana can also be found north of Brisbane, further inland in tropical highland areas as well, such as the Atherton Tableland.

R. plebeiana builds its nest in aggregations, which are often formed under bridges and under overhanging rocks. These aggregations are made of separate nests that are built side by side. They were often built over running water.R. plebeiana with nests in Canberra are not aggregated.

== Colony cycle ==
R. plebeiana colonies have a single top-dominant female, or they are started by one or more foundresses that then compete for egg laying duties. R. plebeiana colonies start in early austral spring. The first brood of workers emerge as adults in mid-December. Reproductive females and males present in early March, and the females may become the foundresses of nests. They are called gynes. Gynes do not stay in the nest after they emerge as adults, but may spend their winters in their maternal nests. Most wasps were gone from the nest by late austral autumn, and this ends the reproductive stage of the nest. Most females leave the nest by May 1. Founding females in the nests do not stay in the nest overnight, and before dusk they leave the nest for the night. Females returned to the nest when the sun heated up the nest, and began their activities. These patterns of leaving and returning depend on the temperature of the nest.

== Nesting patterns ==
=== Occupying old nests ===
Nests maintain their structural integrity over the winter months because they are hidden from the elements, and top dominant females sometimes occupy previously occupied nests. They may return to the nests of their mothers to start their own colony there or with up to 10 other females. If this is the case, the foundresses divide the comb into their own nesting areas. They then fight to be the sole foundress and egg layer. Other females may remain as subordinate workers. The first brood females were larger than non laying foundresses in the nest. Occupying an old nest has advantages, because females do not feed to forage for nesting materials, and they can spend nights and cold days in the places between the nests in aggregations. The competition for these old nests is fierce, and early females have the advantage. Females may lose the competition to be egg-layers at a nest, but may remain in the nest to get the benefit of fitness through relatives kin or by creating their own nests nearby, adding to the nest aggregation.

=== Multi-foundress nests ===
Foundresses have developed ovaries with oocytes, and those with only slightly developed ovarioles are non laying foundresses. Foundresses had fresh wings and mandibles, whereas other females (the non-laying foundresses) had worn-out, shorter wings and mandibles. The length of the largest body mass of the wasp, the mesosoma, is greater in multi-female colonies than other colonies. Solitary laying foundresses were smaller than those of multi-female colonies. Once the dominance hierarchy of the foundresses has occurred, monopolization of the oviposition by a single foundress occurs. There can be more than one laying foundress in colonies with more than 20 foundresses. Single foundress colonies were more common in newly constructed nests.

=== Aggregations ===
An aggregation is a collection of nests built next to each other, and the collection of nests interact with each other for various purposes. Nests communicate in different ways. The nests in an aggregation are suspended side by side. They are suspended in a horizontal position from whatever they are nesting against, but older nests may be suspended vertically. New nests form mainly along the edge of aggregations. R. plebeiana nest aggregations can persist for up to 15 years. In aggregations of R. plebeiana, each comb is independent nest that is occupied by residential females. There is rarely drift between the different nests, and aliens to the nest were expelled and attacked.

=== Costs and benefits of aggregations ===
Nests are very beneficial to R. plebeiana. Survival rate of nests in aggregation are very high, over 90%. The main pros of aggregating are high survival rates of nests and high reproductive rates for females. However, overexploitation of food sources such as insects may occur, so foraging trips may need to be at locations farther away from the nests. Possible reasons for aggregation are based on cooperation or the selfish herd effect. Also, the whole colony together may act as a communal defense against predators. There are risks however, because if a new nest joins the aggregation and does not play a role in this defense, they could increase their fitness at the expense of everyone else. The factors regulating the aggregations in these areas as forest fires, which could destroy a whole aggregation, the collapse of the cliffs they are built on, and possible attacks by predators.

== Behavior ==
=== Dominant behavior ===
In R. plebeiana, the regular nestmates do not direct any dominance or aggressive acts. Some dominance acts that the top dominant female conducted were “dart at another but stop short.” They also attack new wasps coming to the nest. The top dominant female can mount the new wasps body and tried to sting them repeatedly in order to get them to leave the nest. The attacked wasp made a particular posture when attacked, tried to integrate into the nest, and successfully did so. Sometimes, when females land on strange combs in a nest aggregation, they immediately leave without being attacked. Other dominance acts exhibited by females were pecking, mounting, and biting. Sometimes these fights resulted in a loss of wing ability.

=== Foraging ===
In R. plebeiana, females, not males are the ones who forage for the food for larvae. Females also forage for plant fibers for nest construction. The top dominant female does not forage directly for insect meat, the other females do. On foraging trips, these females get solid food, honey, water, or pulp for the nest. Sometimes however, the females give the flesh pellets they accumulate while foraging to the top-dominant female, who passes these pellets onto the males. In this way, both males and females do the feeding. Flesh pellets are shared with individuals back at the nest upon return, and they are particularly often shared with males. Males do not solicit prey-laden females for these pellets, but they are given to them.

=== Feeding ===
Food for larvae is typically insects. Food is brought back to the nests by females, and then distributed. The period of malaxation for females is generally much shorter than males, about 30 seconds, and then they feed several larvae with a single flesh pellet. Males on the other hand can chew for a couple of minutes, approximately 3–4 minutes, and then feed only one mature larva during a feeding episode. This larval feeding by males means they are extracting liquid from the food, possibly to get rid of the pellet after this extraction. However, males of R. plebeiana were not observed to get rid of pellets, so further research needs to be conducted.

=== Female behavior ===
In R. plebeiana, specifically in aggregations of nests, females were observed to have specific behaviors when in their individual nests. Females repeatedly stick their head into larval cells and vibrate their heads in the cell. This behavior was observed as a way for the females to check on the larvae. Females were also observed to “kiss” for the sake of transferring food or liquid between different members of the nest. When the regular females the top dominant female kissed, the top dominant female got the larger part of the food. Females also “kissed” males in order to pass food along to them, so that they could also feed the larvae.
