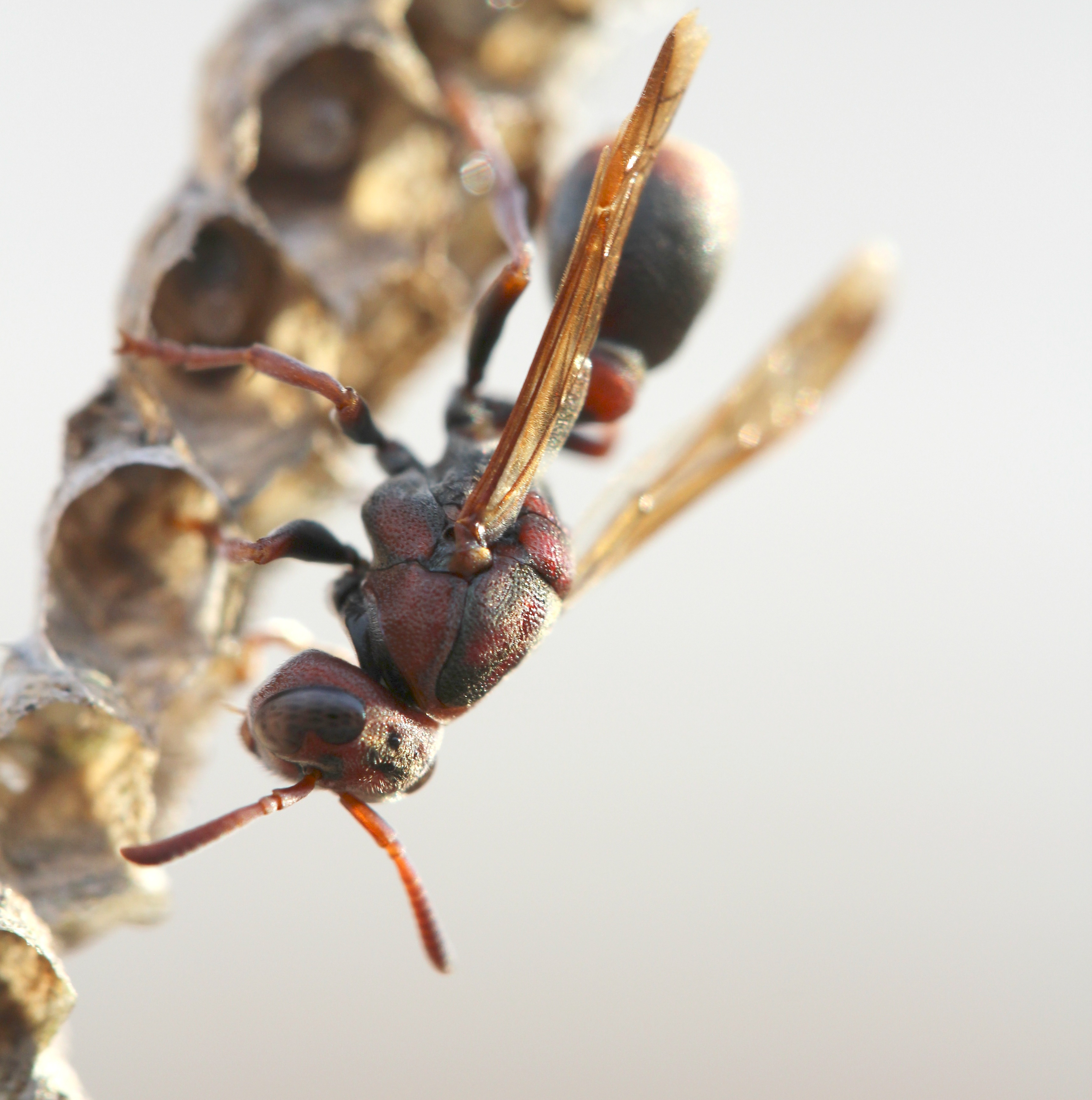
- Ropalidia revolutionalis photographed in Brisbane, Australia

Scientific classification
- Kingdom: Animalia
- Phylum: Arthropoda
- Clade: Pancrustacea
- Class: Insecta
- Order: Hymenoptera
- Family: Vespidae
- Subfamily: Polistinae
- Tribe: Ropalidiini
- Genus: Ropalidia
- Species: R. revolutionalis

Binomial name
- Ropalidia revolutionalis (de Saussure, 1853)

= Ropalidia revolutionalis =

Species of wasp

Ropalidia revolutionalis, the stick-nest brown paper wasp, is a diurnal social wasp of the family Vespidae that is known for the distinctive combs they make for their nests. They occur in Australia in Queensland, Australia. They are an independent founding wasp species, and they build new nests each spring. They can be helpful because they control insect pests in gardens.

== Taxonomy and phylogenetics ==
Ropalidia revolutionalis were first classified by Henri Louis Frédéric de Saussure in 1853. They are part of the polistine tribe Ropalidiini, which includes paper wasps in the Australasian region, specifically in the Lesser Sunda Islands and the northern regions of Australia. They are also part of the genus Ropalidia, which is the only genus that contains both swarm-founding and independent founding wasp species.

== Description and identification ==
These wasps are small, dark and reddish brown with body lengths of 8 to 10 mm. When viewed closely, they have remarkable patterns on their bodies, and they have eyes with multiple lenses. They are slightly smaller than species from the family of Polistes. This is because their abdomens have a segment after the waist that is slimmer than the following segment. Although these wasps are not considered especially aggressive, they will sting if their nests are disturbed.

== Distribution and habitat ==
These wasps are found mainly in south-eastern to northern Queensland, Australia, including the northeastern coast, Brisbane, and Townsville.

The nests of R. revolutionalis consist of several adjacent combs each about 39.0 mm long with two columns of cells. Their nests are usually found on near other sheltered areas: shrubs, fences, hanging baskets, or eaves.

== Colony cycle ==
Ropalidia revolutionalis is an independent-founding wasp species that begins building nests each spring. Each nest is founded by a small association of females that begin by creating a single comb. During this pre-emergence stage, the number of egg-laying females decreases to only one being present in the nest (haplometrosis). However, after the emergence of the first progeny of adults, the females create smaller combs alongside the largest comb, and more potential egg-layers join the colony as the construction progresses (pleometrosis). The progeny join the adults in taking care of the nests. Near the end of summer, the queen produces both male wasps and fertile female wasps. These progeny then mate with wasps from other colonies, and then the females find secure locations in which they can reside during the winter. At this point, the colonies begin to deteriorate, and the females start their own colonies the following spring.

== Division of labor ==
=== Nest building ===
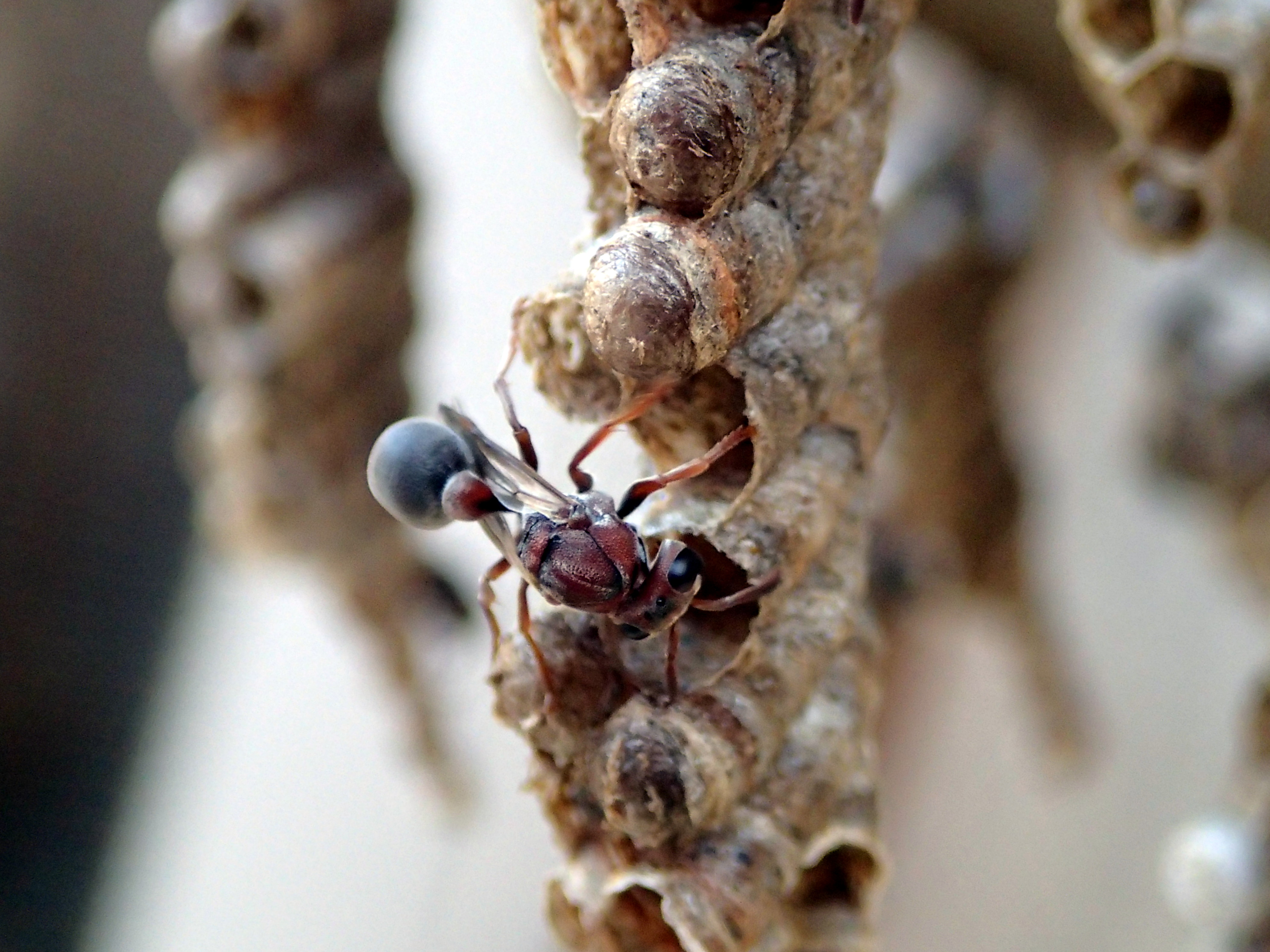
Ropalidia revolutionalis inspecting a comb. (More combs shown in the background)

Each colony begins as a single comb constructed by a few females or by one female, and eventually the colony gains smaller satellite combs as the year progresses. Workers create these combs by using pulp and decaying wood which they chew and mix with their saliva. Each comb is made up of two rows of cells attached by a pedicle (stalk) at the upper end. Also, occasionally females reconstruct old nests that partially deteriorated during the winter, which suggests that some colonies last more than one year.

=== Caring for larvae ===
Each larva of R. revolutionalis is kept in an individual cell in the nest. Each of these cells has a transparent bottom where the workers remove feces from the cell. Foragers return to the nest with caterpillars and other soft bodied insects. Before presenting food to the larvae, they drum their heads on the inside of the cell. Females rear the young into August even as the nest deteriorates, and the larvae eventually pupate and become adult wasps.

=== Worker activity ===
During the day, foragers search for flowers to take nectar for themselves and hunt soft-bodied insects as provisions for their larvae. When temperatures are high, workers will often raise their abdomens, draw their legs in, and fan their wings rapidly in an effort to cool down the nest. They also continually construct and take care of the cells in the comb.

== Communication ==
=== Feeding ===
Females exchange food either by facing each other and engaging in trophallaxis (the transfer of liquid food by putting the mandibles in opposition) or in some cases by mounting another female and bending over her thorax to transfer food. The reproductive females solicit the most frequently.

=== Alarm ===
When other insects approach the nest, the dominant individuals (functional queens) may vibrate their wings or assume a stance of alarm to warn the other females of approaching danger. Females also demonstrate alarm through agitated movement. This is usually demonstrated by contracting and expanding their abdomens or by holding their antennae straight out from their bodies.

=== Dominance hierarchy ===
Each nest usually contains several larger, dominant (queen-like but not reproducing) females. These females occasionally engage in aggressive acts such as darting around for short intervals or climbing onto the backs of subordinates and chewing or biting. They also tend to occupy the largest comb, while subordinates (those that lack developed eggs) are often forced onto smaller combs or reside on the substrate of the ceiling. Acts of dominance also appear to increase as the colony cycle progresses, so it is possible that some acts of dominance may be performed by the parent-generation on the newly emerging adults.

== Reproduction ==
=== Mating ===
Ropalidia revolutionalis females almost always mate singly, increasing the amount of relatedness within the colony. Also, there is little to no inbreeding within the colonies. This is because males leave the nest and mate with females from other colonies, and newly fertile females also mate with non-related males before hiding during the winter.

==== Reproductive dominance ====
Sometimes eggs laid by subordinate females are eaten by dominant females, but multiple females can still lay eggs after the colony has reached the post-emergence stage. Also, there is usually one primary dominant reproducer, and that producer stays in the nest and sits on capped cells containing pupae.

==== Queen cycling ====
The dominant reproductive female remains dominant until she dies. After this occurs, the colony goes through a short period of having multiple queens (often daughters of the previous queen). Eventually, one queen becomes dominant again, but the nest still contains a few less dominant queens.

== Spatial arrangement ==
The individuals in each colony can usually be separated into three groups: on the nest, next to the nest, or absent from the nest. Those who are on the nest usually consist of the dominant reproductive female, queens, and those caring for the brood or taking care of the nest. If more than one reproducing female is present in a nest, the less dominant one either stays on a smaller comb or remains next to the nest out of the way of the dominant individual. Non-reproductive individuals can reside in all three groups, but they usually remain either next to the nest or absent from the nest foraging for food. If they are on the nest, the dominants often force these subordinates onto smaller combs.

== Defense ==
If a member of either sex of R. revolutionalis feels threatened, the wasp assumes a defensive position on the nest. It will warn the intruder to retreat by first lifting and spreading its wings, and then waving its front legs and sometimes shaking its body. If the threat does not go away, the wasp will then fly at and often sting the intruder.

== Kin selection ==
Since R. revolutionalis queens mate singly, there is a high level of relatedness within the colony, and the workers are more likely to favor the sons produced by workers rather than sons produced by the queen because the workers are more closely related to each other's sons. This can create potential conflict. However, when there are multiple queens in a colony, the level of relatedness decreases, and the workers are more likely to favor the queen's sons. So, the workers switch between wanting to invest in new queens and wanting to invest in males depending on how many queens already exist in the colony.

== Human-wasp interaction ==
Ropalidia revolutionalis help control pests in gardens by catching caterpillars and other insects for their larvae. If possible, their nests are best left alone. However, if disturbed, they will sting. Their venom contains 5-hydroxytryptamine, which is thought to be a pain-producing compound, though the pharmacological mode of action remains unknown.
