= Malcolm Cameron (entomologist) =

English physician and entomologist (1873–1954)

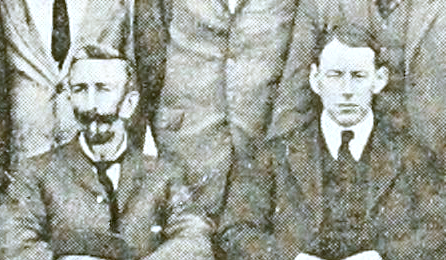
Cameron with T.B. Fletcher, 1921

Malcolm Cameron (1873 – 31 October 1954, London) was an English physician and entomologist who specialised in Coleoptera, particularly the rove beetles (Staphylinidae). He started his working life as a naval surgeon after qualifying in medicine at the London Hospital and collected beetles during his work at various locations. He is especially known for the five volumes on Staphylinidae in The Fauna of British India, Including Ceylon and Burma series. He was a Fellow of the Royal Entomological Society.

Cameron's collection is shared between the Natural History Museum in London (55,000 Staphylinidae) and the Museo Civico di Storia Naturale di Genova in Genoa, Italy.
