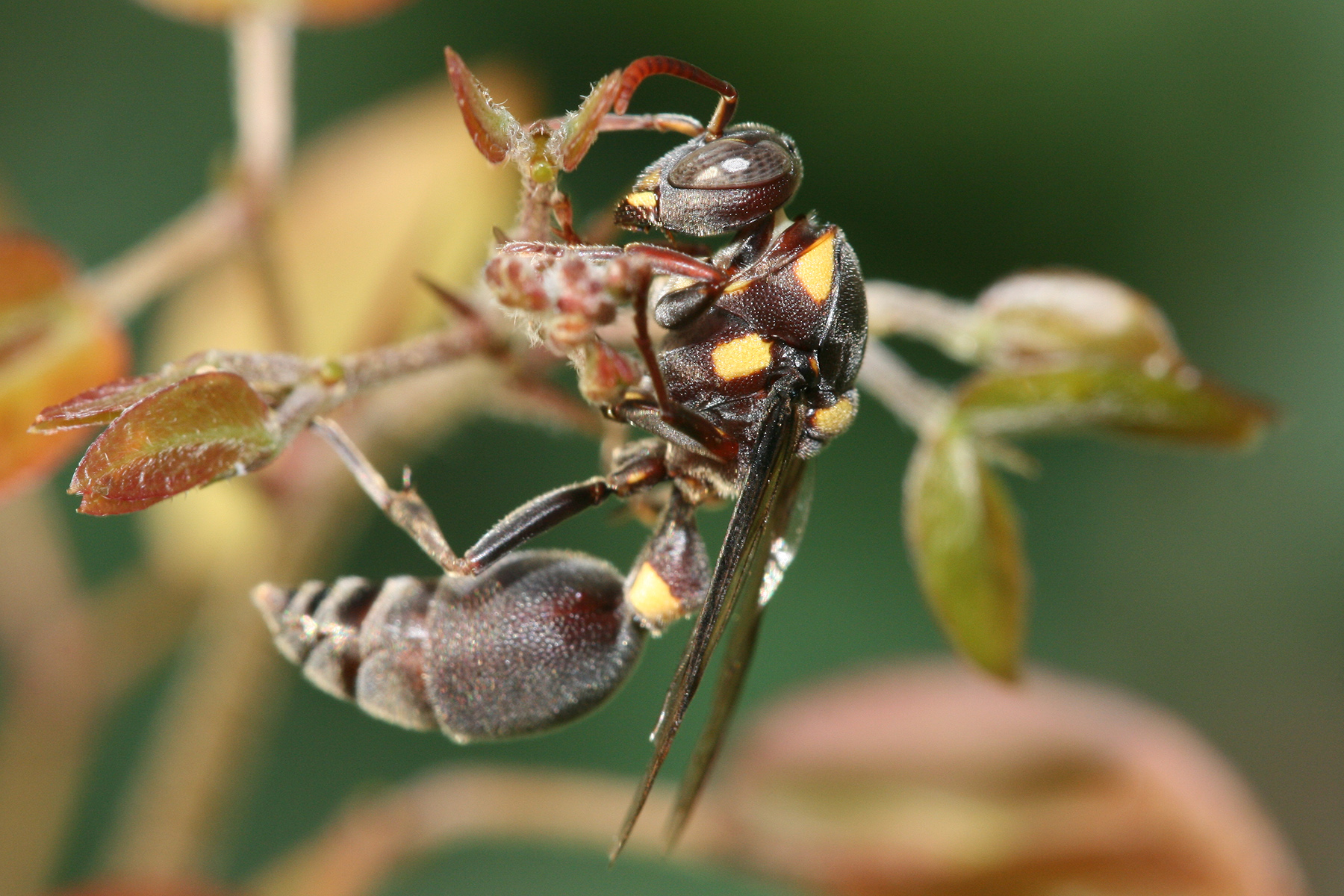
- Ropalidia sp

Scientific classification
- Kingdom: Animalia
- Phylum: Arthropoda
- Clade: Pancrustacea
- Class: Insecta
- Order: Hymenoptera
- Family: Vespidae
- Subfamily: Polistinae
- Tribe: Ropalidiini

= Ropalidiini =

Tribe of wasps

Ropalidiini is a tribe of social wasps inhabiting the Afrotropical, Indomalayan and Australasian biogeographical regions.

== Genera and selected species ==
- Belonogaster
  - Belonogaster juncea (Fabricius, 1781)
  - Belonogaster petiolata (Degeer, 1778)
- †Oligoropalidia
  - †Oligoropalidia aquaesextiae Engel, Nguyen, & Nel, 2024
- Parapolybia
- Polybioides
  - Polybioides raphigastra (Saussure, 1854)
  - Polybioides tabidus (Fabricius, 1781)
- Ropalidia
  - Ropalidia marginata (Lepeletier, 1836)
  - Ropalidia ornaticeps (Cameron, 1900)
  - Ropalidia plebeiana Richards, 1978
  - Ropalidia revolutionalis (Saussure, 1854)
  - Ropalidia romandi (Guill., 1841)
