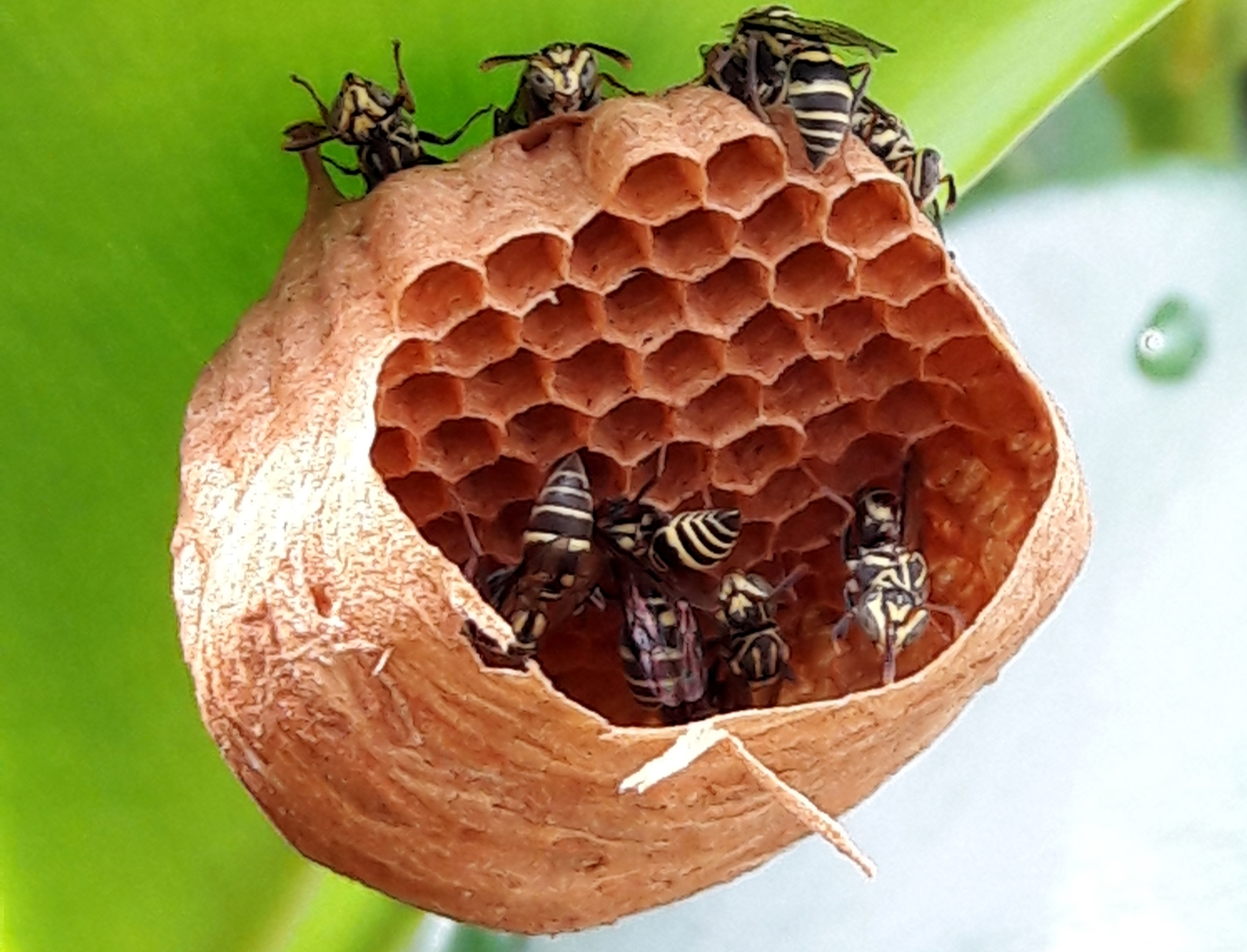

Scientific classification
- Kingdom: Animalia
- Phylum: Arthropoda
- Clade: Pancrustacea
- Class: Insecta
- Order: Hymenoptera
- Family: Vespidae
- Genus: Protopolybia
- Species: P. exigua

Binomial name
- Protopolybia exigua (Saussure, 1906)

= Protopolybia exigua =

Species of wasp

Protopolybia exigua is a species of vespid wasp found in South America and Southern Brazil. These neotropical wasps, of the tribe Epiponini, form large colonies with multiple queens per colony. P. exigua are small wasps that find nourishment from nectar and prey on arthropods. Their nests are disc-shaped and hang from the undersides of leaves and tree branches. This particular species of wasp can be hard to study because they frequently abandon their nests. P. exigua continuously seek refuge from phorid fly attacks and thus often flee infested nests to build new ones. The wasps' most common predators are ants and the parasitoid phorid flies from the Phoridae family.

== Taxonomy and phylogeny ==
The Epiponini belong to the swarm-founding wasp subfamily Polistinae. Epiponini are neotropical swarm-founding wasps characterized by large, multiple-queen colonies. The Protopolybia genus consists of small paper wasps. Ducke (1905) morphologically separated Protopolybia from Pseudochartergus and established their close relation due to physical similarity of a medial posterior process on the metanotum.

== Description and identification ==
Protopolybia exigua are small, swarm founding wasps. One can determine the wasps' age by evaluating the darkness of the cuticle on the apical edge of the fifth gastral sternite. Older wasps typically exhibit darker shades relative to others in its colony. The front wing length is generally 4.15mm, and their wings are more rounded than other wasps. This round wing shape may enhance the wasp species' flying abilities and increase fitness. The muscle mass on P. exigua's mesosoma directly contributes to flight power; the larger the muscle, the stronger the output. Instead of flapping their wings, P. exigua row them due to increased wing drag. Mature P. exigua eggs have a complete chorion and are tinted blue with a shiny coat. Immature oocytes that are equal in size to mature eggs can be distinguished due to their cream and less glossy appearance.

=== Nest composition ===
Protopolybia exigua nests are white or light brown and exhibit domed, paper envelopes. These fibrous envelopes cover the entire comb. The comb is suspended from a leaf or branch by one or more peduncles, with an exit-hole on the side or bottom of the envelope. The nests are also observed to provide many entrance holes, which seem to be a unique feature to the species. On average, there are 1.7 combs and 566 cells per colony. While P. exigua nests typically have one comb, additional combs are sometimes found on certain nests. Cells with brown wafers of meconium towards the bottom indicate that there has been an emergence of new larvae; this discoloration is the result of the larva shedding its waste products during pupation. P. exigua tend to build their nests in locations facing west; it is suggested that this specific placement leads to higher environmental temperatures and proportionally greater foraging activity.

== Distribution and habitat ==
Protopolybia exigua are found from Bolivia to southern Brazil, with particular sightings in Venezuela, Guatemala, and Colombia. The wasps can inhabit orange orchards and eucalyptus plantations. They settle in green areas surrounded by small-sized trees and bushes. Unlike the mud nests of Polybia emaciata and Parachartergus colobopterus that are strongly attached to stable foundations, P. exigua nests are more frequently destroyed. Their nests generally hang from the underside of plant leaves and tree branches. The nests rarely exist for more than 6 months since they are attached to leaves that eventually fall; in addition, the nests are constantly vulnerable to parasitoid infestations. Parasitoid nest destruction can uncouple the wasps' colony cycle from their nesting cycle and ultimately disunite the colony.

== Colony cycle ==
In the course of a colony's life, epiponine wasps flux from polygyny (many queens) to oligogyny (few queens) to monogyny (no queen). This cycle was first proposed by West-Eberhard (1978,1981) and is referred to as cyclical oligogyny. It has been suggested that this cycle is crucial for maintaining high genetic relatedness found among epiponini colonies. The series begins when a group of workers and queens found a nest. As time passes, the colony's total egg layers diminish due either to death or from wasp dominance interactions. The number of egg layers decrease until a couple of queens are left in the colony. Once the colony's queen population is significantly reduced, then a new generation of reproductive females are conceived. Since only a couple of mothers produce this new generation, the female offspring are closely related. Sometimes new queens will leave the old nest and found their own colony, thus repeating the colony cycle.

The different stages in the wasp's colony cycle are labeled and separated by emergence. The pre-emergence stage refers to when there are not many wasp larvae present in the nest. The post-emergence stage is when a colony grows from an increase in larvae population. There is a higher rate of egg-laying and greater number of pupae developing at this phase. According to Noll (1995), the post-swarming stage is when immature wasps are in the mother nest, after the production of sexed individuals and swarming. A small number of old queens and males may also be present at this time. Colonies produce swarms when they have many laying queens; they produce new queens when there is only one queen left in the colony. The number of males produced by queens is lower compared to the number of males produced during swarms. However, colonies that produce swarms also produce males. Swarm queens and swarm workers are produced at different points in the queen cycle, with workers being produced after new queens become reproductive on the parental colony.

In a report comparing 37 P. exigua colonies from Venezuela, the colony population averaged 171 workers, 20 queens, and 24 males. When there was at least one male per colony, the average population of males in colonies was 69.

== Kin selection ==
=== Caste differentiation ===
The morphological differences in P. exigua queens and workers become more distinct as the colony cycle progresses. There are fewer differences within early stage colonies, and correspondingly greater discriminations among later stage colonies. In addition, physical discrepancies between wasp castes are more prominent in colonies with a smaller number of queens. P. exigua queens are generally easier to identify, while it is harder to distinguish between workers and intermediates. The thoracic labial gland is better developed in workers than in queens, but wasp brain size does not differ between castes. Both inseminated and non-inseminated P. exigua females exhibit a greater presence among colonies that frequently experience nest destruction. This might be because nest destruction uncouples the colony cycle from the nesting cycle and can also cause colonies to separate when this might not otherwise have occurred. Males are identified by the presence of testes. Queen body size and relative fecundity seem to be important determinants of queen success within a given colony.

=== Genetic relatedness ===
Since P. exigua colonies consist of many queens, wasps within a given colony should be expected to have low relatedness among one another. However, cyclical oligogyny seems to help colonies maintain a higher level of relatedness. In cyclical oligogyny, new queens are only conceived after most of the colony's queens have died. This late production of new queens guarantees that only a few queens from the previous generation participate. The relatedness among workers in P. exigua is 0.39, which is sufficient for wasps to exhibit worker behavior. Among queens from the same colony, 0.82 are genetically related. Therefore, queens demonstrate a significantly greater genetic relatedness than do workers from their same colony. Thus far, every epinonine species studied exhibits high relatedness among queens. This outcome of relation seems to play a crucial role in the wasp's social behavior and in the colony's success.

=== Queen selection and worker preference ===
Although queen selection is not fully understood, workers clearly have an important role in the queen elimination process. Workers often test queens, and depending on the queens' response, the workers may remove them from the colony. It has been suggested that workers discriminate between queens based on their relative fertility. Workers seem to identify the more fecund queens through various behavioral tests and dismiss any queens with inhibited ovaries. Queen size could be an additional determinant in queen selection. Since size differences between queens and workers increase as the colony ages, smaller queens could be eliminated to create this morphological gap. This selection process also correlates with the fact that a colony's queen population decreases as the colony ages. Colonies begin to gain more queens once they have reached a minimum queen population. The new queens usually reproduce in the old colony, which lowers relatedness. Swarming occurs afterwards, frequently during the queen-reduction cycle. The dissociation between queen cycle and the colony cycle allows worker interests to be satisfied with respect to the timing of queen and male production, without sacrificing the ability to initiate new colonies at appropriate times. Workers prefer this selective pattern of queen emergence because they are three times more closely related to their sisters than to other brothers on single-queen colonies. Workers are equally related to the nieces and nephews that make up most of the brood on multiple-queen colonies.

=== Intermediates ===
Intermediates are workers with fully developed ovaries. These wasps are non-inseminated laying females, and they are present throughout the entire colony cycle. Intermediates lay eggs, but the eggs are eaten either by themselves or by other colony members. It is possible that non-inseminated laying females are always present in order to provide extra energy in the colony. Their eggs may be used for trophic purposes, since male production is controlled entirely by queens. This oophagy (egg eating behavior) can provide additional sustenance for the colony. Inseminated workers are typically older and are likely to have been potential queens at colony initiation. Therefore, non-inseminated egg layers are young and seem to be about to swarm. In a study on P. exigua foraging activity, a higher proportion of workers than intermediates were observed in all the colonies. Their study observed 12 colonies in Bom Jesus da Lapa, Bahia, Brazil.

=== Ovarian distinction ===
Three kinds of ovary development have been recognized in P. exigua. Queen wasps develop ovaries that bear a range from two to several mature oocytes. Intermediates exhibit ovarioles with some oocytes at the beginning of development. Oocytes were sometimes found in the final phase of vitellogenesis as well. Vitellogenesis is the process of yolk formation through deposition of nutrients in the oocyte. Workers have filamentous ovarioles with either no visible oocytes or slightly developed oocytes. Only queen females' spermatheca contained sperm. On average, inseminated queens contain 3.6 mature eggs in their ovaries. Egg laying workers appear to be common in the species, though they frequently eat their own eggs. This oophagy suggests that worker wasps do not compete reproductively with the queens. Most young workers of P. exigua apparently oviposit before their ovaries regress and they begin foraging. Egg eating must occur within this species; otherwise the large numbers of worker-laid eggs would yield many more males than were found in collected colonies.

== Behavior ==
=== Foraging ===
Foraging wasps gather nectar and prey for nourishment and water, resin, and wood pulp for the nest. Nectar is a crucial resource for any colony since it is used for feeding both immatures and adults. Foragers also acquire nectar at lower energy costs compared to that needed to capture prey. It seems to be more advantageous for P. exigua to take the prey in the crop, since their flight becomes less difficult. The number of prey captured by foraging wasps tends to increase as the colony grows. In addition, P. exigua have been reported performing trophallaxis with adults and between adults and larvae. Foraging for animal proteins is the most complex task for worker wasps. In order to successfully hunt prey, wasps require prey recognition, predation ability and the capacity to return to the nest. Foragers must make recognition flights to get an image of the surrounding landmarks that compose its environment at different distances. These flights ultimately enable wasps to use visual markers to direct them back to their colony. It is extremely important that workers carry water to the nest; water collection occurs more often in the warmer periods of the day. Water is a crucial source for nest building, and in its absence, this activity would not happen efficiently. Wood pulp is also collected and taken to the nest for building and nest infrastructure.

=== Environmental influences ===
The earliest P. exigua foragers leave the nest around 6am and foraging stops around 7pm. Foraging activity has been recorded from 11 to 12 am. In the hot and humid season, P. exigua exhibit greater nest activity than in the cold and dry season. Although the foraging of wasps decreases in rainy weather, the delivery of food and nest material does not stop completely. The habitat temperatures directly correlate with wasp activity: as the temperature increases, so does worker foraging. Luminosity has also been reported to influence the beginning and the end of the species' foraging activity. Luminosity seems to have a greater effect on wasp activity when temperatures are more moderate. Additionally, wind speed directly impacts wasp activity; the stronger the wind, the less likely wasps are to exit their nests. Silva (2002) suggests P. exigua participate in a greater amplitude of activity as the latitude of their nesting region decreases. In other words, the closer the wasps are to the Equator, the more active the colonies are. In Ribeiro Jr.'s study on P. exigua from Brazil, he proposed that the wasp develops its foraging activities more efficiently within a flight range of 75m from its nest.

=== Division of labor ===
Queens and males are unlikely to forage since female workers will collect and capture resources for the colony. P. exigua females have been observed carrying orange-colored crops with some solid material that is most likely chitin filled. These chunks seem to be larvae structures of insects belonging to the order Lepidoptera (Dias 2006). There are butterfly and moth fragments of thoracic legs with spines and claws, parts of abdominal legs, pieces of the head cuticle with sensory setae, and apparently parts made of trachea and muscle tissue. P. exigua were observed to transfer complete batches of nest material more often after the appearance of a new generation of workers. In this post-emergence phase, colonies grow a lot, thus foraging activity amplifies. Colonies in the post-swarming stage exhibit a decrease in activity.

Worker polyethism occurs in P. exigua colonies and separates labor based on age of individual wasps. The wasps work inside the nest when young and slowly begin foraging more as they mature. After the emergence of workers in large colonies, some foragers become specialized in delivering specific types of material to the nest. The gatherers of nest material do not build the nest themselves; instead, they pass the foraged materials onto designated builders, who proceed to distribute the materials to colony workers. This specified behavior is called “task fixation” and seems to make wasps more efficient in their gathering skills. However, it also makes the fixated foragers less responsive to changes in supply and demand of materials. P. exigua colonies have a greater proportion of nonfixated wasps than fixated wasps, therefore the species as a whole can successfully adapt to resource changes.

=== Prioritizing resources ===
Protopolybia exigua were observed to collect pulp (paper) mainly in the pre-emergence phase, but also in the post-emergence phase. In both phases, the colony expands and increases its number of nest cells. Thus, both phases potentially demand a greater amount of pulp for the building process. The importance of pulp decreases as time passes and as the colony ages; correspondingly, prey collection becomes a priority for foraging workers. In contrast, resin gathering was observed only in post-emergent wasp colonies. However, resin collection may also occur in the early phases of P. exigua colonies. It is proposed that P. exigua wasps may require resin when constructing nests and after partial destruction. P. exigua tend to gather nectar more frequently in the pupa sub-stage, however continue to collect nectar throughout each phase. The wasps seem to hunt prey solely during this sub-stage; however, researchers suggest P. exigua also collect prey in the larva sub-stage. This seems likely since the species' offspring demand a large amount of food that is mainly protein-based.

=== Nest organization ===
When P. exigua catch prey, they return to the nest with a solid, usually glossy mass, held in their mouthparts. If the size of prey is relatively large, the wasp may hold the crop with its anterior legs. Wasps were reported to share this food with other adults and offer the protein in a macerated form to larvae. The water gathered by workers is placed directly onto the walls of the nest cells, usually without any contact with other wasps. Wood pulp and fibers are collected primarily for nest building. Wasps return to the nest with a solid mass taken in the mouthparts; they are usually smaller and darker than the prey crop. P. exigua has the habit of building white or light brown nests, so the item taken to the nest for colony growth was white and larger than the prey. This item is chewed, mixed with saliva and incorporated in the cell walls. Resin is gathered in order to build layers within the nest. Workers carrying resin to the nest travel to substrate sheets and proceed to lay their foraged material on top of the structure. This new layer remains there until the sheets stuck together and formed a stronger partition.

== Interactions with other species ==
=== Diet ===
Protopolybia exigua consume nectar and prey on arthropods. P. exigua could potentially help control potential pests since they frequently hunt insects. Their prey include Lepidoptera such as caterpillars, butterflies, and moths. According to Machado (1974), P. exigua colonies also feed on the honey stored in the peripheral nest cells. The wasps acquire protein from hunting several groups of arthropods. Foraging wasps crush their caught prey and carry the softened corpses back to the nest. Nectar is the wasp's main resource, since it is taken to the nest throughout each colony phase. P. exigua collect nectar from many different plants and at floral and extrafloral nectaries. They also prey on the secretions from aphids and coccids (Hemiptera).

=== Sting ===
Protopolybia exigua is an aggressive species, known for its frequent stings. The sting causes its victims intense pain and relative damage around the puncture site. The wasp's venom can occasionally lead to death in large vertebrates, including man.

=== Parasitoids ===
In Brazil, P. exigua nests can become infested by phorid flies, which cause colonies to flee and abandon their nests. Megaselia picta females emerge from P. exigua nests and proceed to lay their eggs outside, on the uppermost envelope. This outer part of the nest contains meconial wastes and is where larvae reach the basal parts of the cells. Once the eggs hatch, the emerging larvae crawl towards the wasp's nest and scavenge for food. Megaselia picta larvae will eat wasp meconia, eggs, larvae, and pupae. Megaselia attack quickly, with erratic-jerking movements and systematic oviposition behavior. Their distinct motions enable them to fly proficiently and walk rapidly. Aerial raids further enhance the success of their attacks, thus making these parasites a serious enemy to P. exigua. Megaselia scalaris have also been observed to cause P. exigua to frequently decamp.

=== Predation and defensive strategies ===
Ants are the greatest threat of predation for P. exigua. Many of the wasps' traits, such as polygyny and protective nest structures, are suggested to be survival tactics against ant predation pressures. P. exigua are also observed to swarm and use scent-trail diversions as defense strategies. During Megaselia infestation, workers attempt to destroy all infested cells in order to terminate the parasitoids. However, wasps are often unable to eradicate the phorid pupae due to their strong attachment to the cell bottom. If the workers fail, then the wasps close the nest entrances and the colony flees to another location in the neighborhood to build a new nest. Once they have established a new nest, wasps will entirely close the old nest's entrance, which prevents the encroaching parasitoid flies from coming inside. The wasps also fan their wings and use their mandibles to peck attack the phorid flies. Since P. exigua seem to be specialized against the common predation of ants, Megaselia easily defeat the wasps' defense strategies and frequently invade the species nests.
