= Chartergellus jeannei =

Scientific classification
- Domain: Eukaryota
- Kingdom: Animalia
- Phylum: Arthropoda
- Class: Insecta
- Order: Hymenoptera
- Family: Vespidae
- Subfamily: Polistinae
- Genus: Chartergellus
- Species: C. jeannei

Binomial name
- Chartergellus jeannei Andena and Soleman, 2015

Species of wasp

Chartergellus jeannei is a new wasp species described by specimens found at the Ducke Reserve in Manaus Brazil. The species in named in honor of Professor Robert L. Jeanne an animal behaviorist and expert in social wasps.
