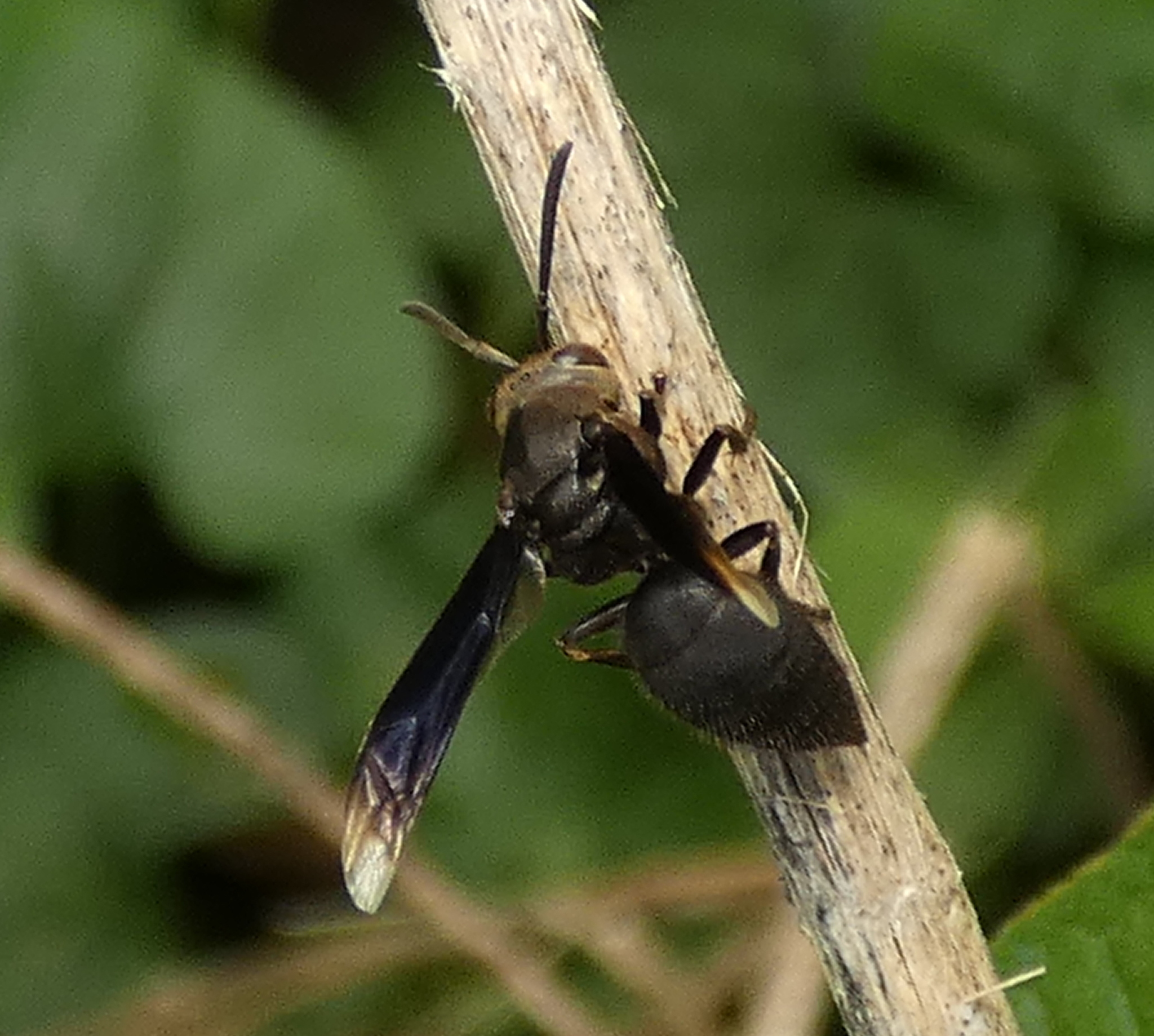
- Parachartergus fraternus in Brazil

Scientific classification
- Kingdom: Animalia
- Phylum: Arthropoda
- Class: Insecta
- Order: Hymenoptera
- Family: Vespidae
- Subfamily: Polistinae
- Genus: Parachartergus
- Species: P. fraternus

Binomial name
- Parachartergus fraternus (Gribodo, 1892)

= Parachartergus fraternus =

Species of wasp

Parachartergus fraternus is a neotropical, swarm founding, polistine wasp species that is distributed throughout Central and South America. They live in nests in second growth tropical dry forests, near pasture fields, roadside areas, and urban areas as well. These wasps eat insects, such as caterpillars of Lepidoptera. They also drink nectar, honeydew, and water. The workers capture their prey during foraging. They also use venom to paralyze their prey in order to consume it later. P. fraternus wasps are not very aggressive and they do not attack when the nest is approached.

== Taxonomy and phylogeny ==
Parachartergus fraternus is closely related to the species Parachartergus apicalis. These wasps belong to the genus Parachartergus, which has sixteen species distributed from Mexico to southern Argentina. Ten of these species are found in Brazil and two are endemic. Most Parachartergus species have few morphological differences between castes in all stages of the colony cycle.

== Description and identification ==
=== Wasp appearance ===
For a wasp species, Parachartergus fraternus is average in size. A typical Parachartergus fraternus forager is about 11 mm long, 3 mm wide across its thorax, and weighs about 0.05 g. Queens do not differ morphologically from workers and are therefore similar in size. The dorsal and ventral parts of the body are blackish which is a characteristic of this species. The abdomen has a fusiform shape with short hairs that can only be seen with a microscope. The abdomen is linked to the thorax by a pedunculum. At rest, the wings are longitudinally bent with the last distal part being clear and colorless (almost white). The wings also have very pronounced veins. The eyes of the wasp are big and compound with a large number of facets. The antennae are bent at a sharp angle and the mouthparts are orange colored. The age of the wasp is determined by examining the progressive pigmentation of the transverse apodeme, which is located at the base of each sternum. The youngest wasps have no pigmentation, middle aged wasps have brown coloring, and the oldest wasps have black coloring.

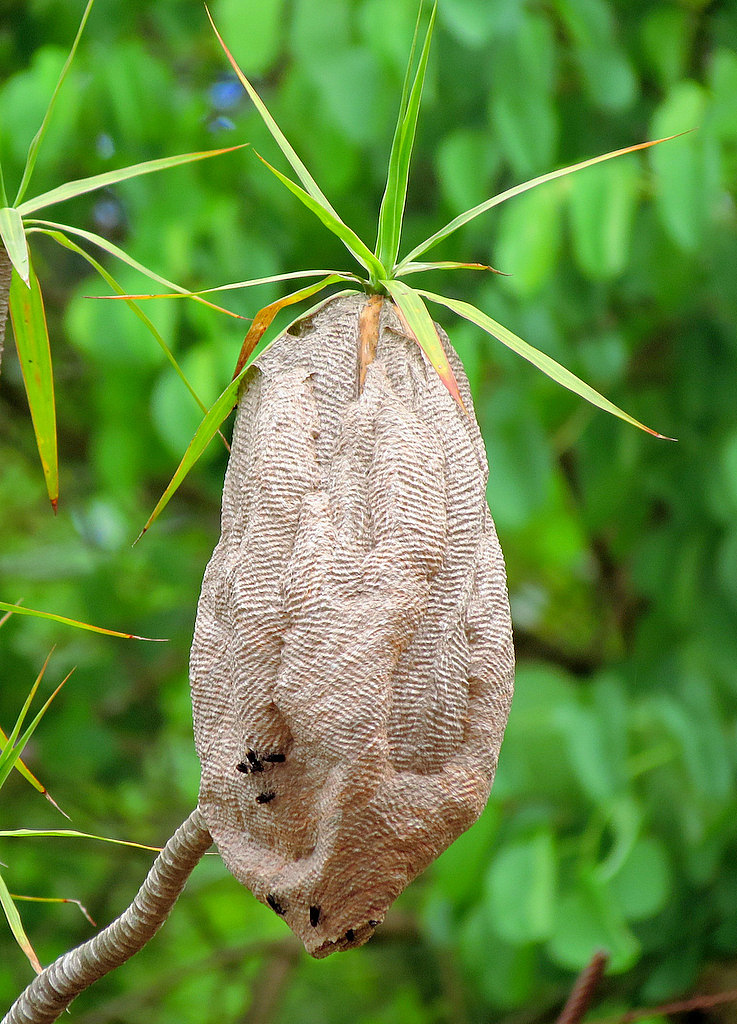

=== Nest structure ===
Parachartergus fraternus nests are covered by a protective envelope which characterizes this species. The envelope often has only one opening to the soil which protects against ants, the wasp's main enemy. The wasp envelope is gray and constructed of long fibers. It is also single sheeted and has horizontal ridges. Peduncles are usually 6 mm wide and 7 mm long and are composed of vegetal fibers that are attached to the base of the nest with saliva. The nests have several layers of cells that are fixed to leaves or branches that branch out to a lateral stalk. The openings to the cells in the nest are directed downwards and have hexagonal walls. Although the sizes of nests vary, the diameter of these cells is usually around 4 mm while the height is around 10 mm. Some colonies have two combs with 98 cells while others may have 12 combs with 1751 cells.

== Distribution and habitat ==
Parachartergus fraternus is found throughout Central and South America. There is a large density in southeast Brazil, especially in São Paulo state and Minas Gerais state in Matias Barbosa municipality. Nests are usually close to the Brazilian savannah, which is called the cerrado. This wasp species also has a large presence in Costa Rica. P. fraternus wasps typically live in second growth tropical dry forests. A second growth forest is a forest that has regrown after a major disturbance. These wasps build their nests by pasture fields, in roadside areas, and in urban city areas as well. Nests are often directly attached to the smooth surfaces of tree trunks, branches, and walls.

== Colony cycle ==
Usually new colonies are formed by older individuals who swarm and create a new nest. The young P. fraternus queens stay behind to keep the older nest alive. The colony cycle begins with a pre-emergence period, which occurs before the emergence of the first offspring. Pre-emergence colonies have mostly older individuals. After this, the post-emergence period occurs which is the whole duration of the colony cycle following the appearance of offspring wasps. Next, is the pre-matrifilial phase. This is the first part of the post-emergence period and occurs when subordinate foundresses are still present in nests, interacting with worker wasps. Following this period is the matrifilial phase, which comes after the disappearance of all subordinates. Colonies now consist of only the queen and her workers. Lastly, there is a reproductive phase, where reproductive offspring (gynes and males) are born. Gynes start emerging from nests around early February; thus any female collected from colonies up to the end of January of each season will most likely be a worker. The colony cycle is usually annual, with foundress females beginning new nests in the spring after having overwintered for about 4.5 months.

== Kin selection ==
=== Caste indistinguishability ===
Despite the age of the colony, castes are almost always indistinguishable. Caste totipotency exists where all individual wasps are totipotent. Totipotency is the ability of a single cell to produce all of the differentiated cells in an organism. Therefore, one young wasp could turn out to be a queen or a worker. So, caste determination is dictated post-imaginally (pre-adult determination). In Parachartergus fraternus, the reproductive females resemble non reproductive females: there are not many physical differences. Based on morphology alone it is difficult to distinguish between castes. There is evidence for caste flexibility in Parachartergus fraternus. Intermediates may be potential queens but also perform some worker activities early on in their lives.

=== Determining caste ===
Caste can only be determined by ovary examination and insemination data. Queen wasps were determined by the amount of sperm they had in their spermatheca (inseminated or not). Intermediate females were defined as females with some ovarian development, and workers have no ovarian development. Intermediate is not considered its own caste, though. Many females had fully developed ovaries but were not inseminated. There seemed to be little difference between these females and queens other than insemination. However, when non-inseminated females were more common, inseminated females had more developed oocytes. In some colonies, queens were slightly bigger than workers in several characteristics, but in others they were smaller. In most of the colonies, intermediates did not differ in size from queens and were usually a bit larger than workers. Caste differences seem to be more obvious as the colony ages. The differences in P. fraternus castes vary according to colony cycle. In a pre-emergence colony and one of the two worker-producing colonies, queens were larger in body size than workers, while smaller in one of the two male-producing colonies. Females can potentially become either queens (reproductives) or workers (non-reproductives) according to intracolony and environmental factors.

=== Minor caste differences ===
During emigration especially, P. fraternus queens are usually recognized by their slower movement as compared to workers. Their wings are usually also half open and their gasters are curved laterally by about 30 degrees towards approaching wasps. Queen status is mostly only confirmed by observations of egg laying, however, queens also had wider first terga than did workers. Eye width was also slightly larger for queens. Overall, there are very few differences between workers, intermediates, and queens, and telling the difference usually involves killing the wasp to examine the ovaries.

=== Ovary development ===
In Parachartergus fraternus, five patterns of ovary development were seen. The first pattern was filamentous ovarioles with no oocytes (eggs) seen. The second pattern includes slightly developed oocytes. The third pattern is when wasps have smaller, defined oocytes. The 4th pattern is when the ovaries contain large but immature oocytes only at the base of the ovary; and lastly, the fifth pattern is when wasp ovaries contain very well developed oocytes and at least one mature egg. Only patterns 1 and 5 were found in pre-emergence and worker producing colonies.

== Behavior ==
=== Oophagy ===
When intermediates lay eggs, their eggs are often eaten by the egg laying wasp herself. This is known as oophagy. This may occur because this practice increases energy circulation. These wasps may not be able to store protein well, so they consume their own eggs, reintroducing the protein into their bodies. This supports the idea that queens do in fact control reproduction in the colonies. Intermediates know they are not in charge, so they consume their own eggs.

=== Foraging activity ===
The greatest foraging activity of P. fraternus occurs during the hottest part of the day, which is usually between noon and 2:30pm. There is a positive correlation of temperature and foraging behavior and a negative correlation between humidity in the air and foraging behavior. There was the greatest foraging (bringing back the most food) during the pre-emergence phase of the colony cycle because of increased nest construction and a large nutritional demand from the brood. Foraging is important because the nest needs water to maintain a certain temperature. It also needs wood pulp to construct and repair cells and sugary substances like nectar and honeydew to feed the brood and adults. Protein of animal origin is also required to feed to the larvae. When workers are bringing back food and building materials it slows their flight down. There are food foragers, nectar foragers and water foragers. Foragers with distended abdomens that exchange liquid at the nest entrance are most likely water foragers; while foragers with normal abdomens that exchange liquids inside the nest are nectar foragers. Prey and pulp are easy to see in the wasp's mandibles, and so these wasps were more easily identified as food and material foragers.

=== Weather and foraging ===
The humidity and temperature determines the amount of foraging that occurs in Parachartergus fraternus nests. There was almost double the amount of foraging on sunny days than on cloudy days. This means that the number of wasps leaving and returning to the nest was lower on cloudy days than on sunny days. On cloudy days there was a milder temperature and a higher relative humidity. On sunny days there was lower humidity, a warmer temperature, and higher brightness levels. The temperature has positive effects on foraging while humidity had negative effects. Wasps are also less likely to forage on windy days. They must consider the amount of energy it takes to leave the nest, find and subdue the prey, and carry it back to the nest. Windier weather makes this harder. There may be metabolic adjustments to seasonal changes of temperature and humidity. Time of day also factors into foraging behavior. Longer days are more favorable for flight. Wasps are also exposed to more predation on sunny days because predators are usually more active too. This variation in foraging levels is also seen in other wasp species like P. lanio lanio.

== Venom ==
=== Venom, stinging, and attack ===
Forager wasps use venom and stinging to subdue caterpillars that they bring back to the nest for consumption. The wasps sting the caterpillars multiple times and then wait until their prey is paralyzed enough to approach. Then the wasp must bite its prey into chunks in order to carry it back to the nest. The larvae prey lose muscular control, become paralyzed, and then the wasp grasps the caterpillar in its mandibles and chews it into packets of meat. Venom is used to paralyze prey but is also used to deter nest predators. Since it is hard for wasps to subdue prey that are similar in size, the wasp may get hurt and maybe even tear its wing in the attack. Most wasp species do not use stinging to subdue prey like Parachartergus fraternus does. Usually, they use physical means, and use stinging as more of a defensive tactic. Therefore, Parachartergus fraternus can probably attack a more diverse set of prey, in terms of both prey size and type, due to their frequent use of paralyzing stings . Birds also sometimes agitate these wasps, but they usually do not attack because they are not a very aggressive species.

=== Venom spraying on the nest ===
Different venom compositions have evolved to serve different roles. Parachartergus fraternus venom is also often sprayed on new nest sites before the nest is built. This venom has an intense smell and can even cause an allergic reaction in the eyes and nose of humans. This venom is sprayed on the nest to alert other wasps to the new nest site. The potent smell attracts the wasps that may have lost their way along the emigration route. This venom is sprayed by the foragers when they finally decide on a new nest site.

== Colony emigration process ==
=== Pre-Emigration ===
When the envelope and comb of a Parachartergus fraternus nest are removed or manipulated, the wasps to make defensive buzzing patterns and then disperse. Brood cannibalism is additionally observed. Eventually, the disturbance leads to colony emigration. Scouts are in charge of finding the new nesting site. They visit leaves, trees, fences, and walls in different directions within 50 meters of the old nest. They then create an odor trail by dragging their abdomens and depositing venom or Dufour's gland secretions that leads to the chosen new site. The newly chosen nesting site is also sprayed with venom prior to the adults all moving there in a swarm cloud. This is done to mark the end point of the emigration trail.

=== Emigration ===
When emigrating, scout P. fraternus wasps lead the whole pack of wasps to the site in a swarm cloud that is about 2 to 4 meters wide and 3 meters tall. After landing on the new nest site, the scouts usually brushed antennas with each other and put their mouthparts on the new substrate. Then, they perform gaster dragging and flight looping behaviors to signify that they have arrived at the new nest site. These behaviors are usually repeated many times. Nest construction generally begins shortly afterwards with combs and peduncles being built. Old pulp from the previous nest site is used to construct the new nest. Scout wasps then return to the old nest to attempt to activate inactive wasps to depart by dragging and shaking their gasters and initiating mouth contact. After these interactions with scouts, the previously inactive wasps begin flying around and depart within a few minutes. Males often do not follow the swarm because they are not able to follow the swarm emigration trail. P. fraternus does not form clusters along the emigration route like some other species do when they emigrate. During an emigration, some worker wasps morph into the role of scouts.

== Interactions with other species ==
=== Pest control ===
Social wasps like Parachartergus fraternus are biological control agents of pests. They mostly prey on caterpillars and grubs of Lepidoptera to gain protein to feed to their larvae. Lepidoptera larvae are pests in forest and agriculture plantations, so these wasps help to control the numbers of these animals. If wasps did not prey on these caterpillars, their numbers would swell and much crop damage would be done because caterpillars eat away at these plants.

=== Diet ===
Parachartergus fraternus feeds primarily on caterpillars of Lepidoptera. They eat the adults and larvae of this species. Usually, adult wasps find prey, subdue it, chew it up and bring this back to feed the others. The whole prey is not brought back at once but in small masticated chunks. Wasps also consume nectar and honeydew that has been collected by foragers. This is usually stored in viscous drops inside the cells within the nest. Honeydew is usually obtained from insects of the family Aetalionidae, while water is found all around the environment.
