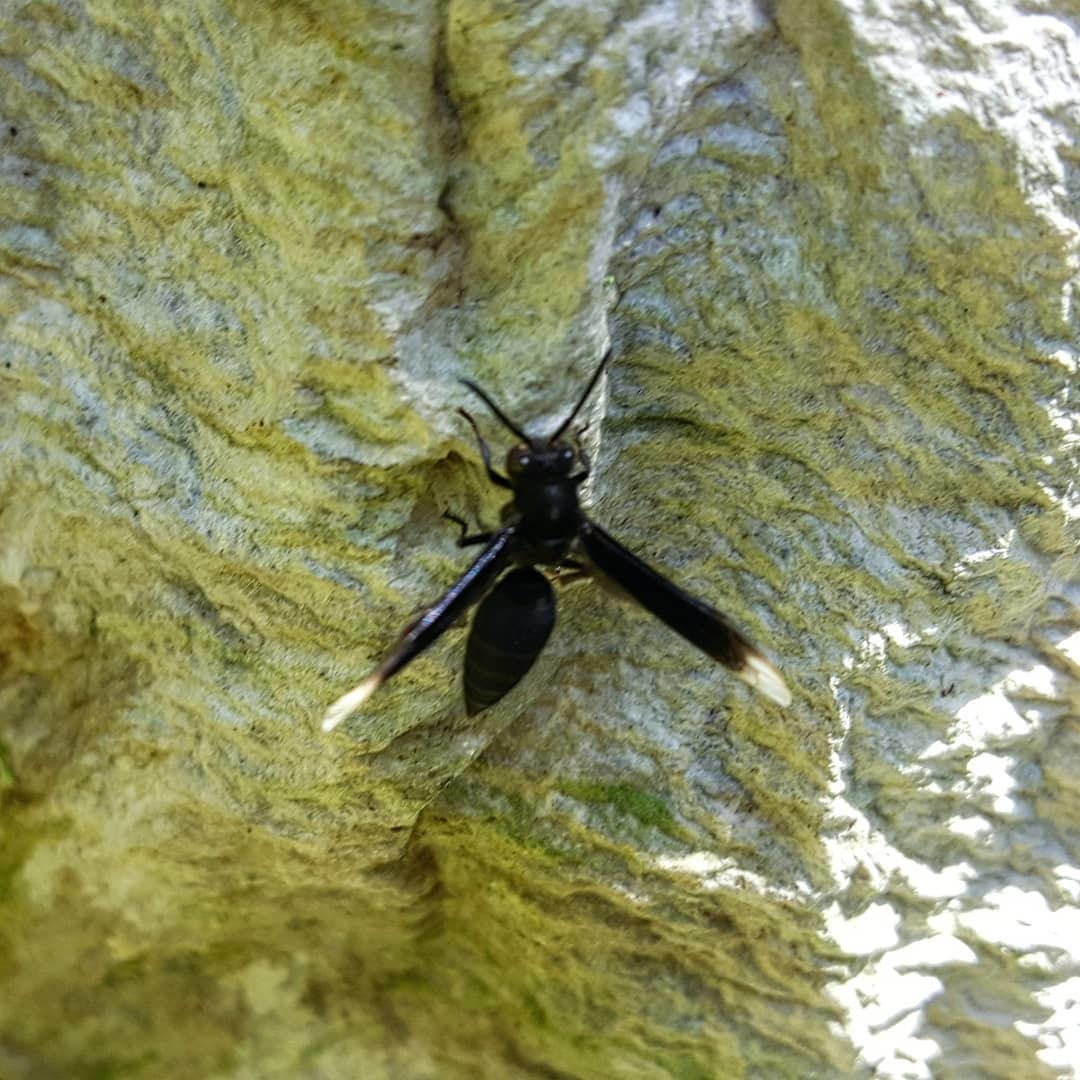
- Parachartergus apicalis in Veracruz, Mexico

Scientific classification
- Domain: Eukaryota
- Kingdom: Animalia
- Phylum: Arthropoda
- Class: Insecta
- Order: Hymenoptera
- Family: Vespidae
- Subfamily: Polistinae
- Genus: Parachartergus
- Species: P. apicalis

Binomial name
- Parachartergus apicalis (Fabricius, 1804)

= Parachartergus apicalis =

Species of wasp

Parachartergus apicalis is a species of wasp in the Polistinae subfamily, found in the Neotropics. It was first described by Johan Christian Fabricius in 1804. In Honduras, they are known as alas blancas, which translates into English as "white wings".

== Behaviour ==
They have been observed to swarm when they move between nests, with the behaviour occurring between April and May in Paraguay. At times they form temporary compact clusters along the route of the swarm; each cluster is evenly spaced and individuals move from one clump to the next, with the clumps at the back shrinking, whilst those at the front grow. It is uncertain how they navigate between the clumps, but it is thought they use either visual or olfactory cues. False swarming can also occur when strong winds prevent foragers from entering the nest.

They have been recorded to tend species of treehopper, plant sap-feeding insects, during the daytime, an example of a mutualistic relationship. The wasp protects the treehopper nymphs from predators and parasites and in return feeds on honeydew which is produced by the nymphs. At night the carpenter ant species, Camponotus atriceps will tend the nymphs. During the day, P. apicalis will attack these ants, preventing them from tending the treehoppers. Each wasp is loyal to one group of treehopper nymphs, and will only leave them for less than 10 minutes at a time. The closely related species, Parachartergus fraternus also tends treehoppers.

The genitalia of males can perform movements of "startling complexity". The aedeagus is flexible and can move from side to side, as well as rotating 180° on its long axis, making the slightly bulbous tip move either to the left or the right. There are also two finger-like digiti which can move independently of each other and the aedeagus. West-Eberhard described the movements of the genitalia as being the "most fluid and subtly modulated movements" that she had ever observed in wasps. She also suggested that males may stimulate the females with their genitalia during courtship.

They may be necrophagic, but this is based on an observation that one of their nests smelt of rotting meat and no direct observations of necrophagy have been recorded.

== Mimics ==
Parachartergus apicalis is mimicked by two species of Lepidoptera, Sphecosoma aliena and Myrmecopsis strigosa. These are thought to be examples of Müllerian mimicry, since predators pay a high penalty for mistaking a Lepidopteran for the wasp and there is a small reward from correctly identifying the Lepidoptera, since they are bitter tasting and covered in scales.
