= Myrmecopsis polistes =

Scientific classification
- Kingdom: Animalia
- Phylum: Arthropoda
- Class: Insecta
- Order: Lepidoptera
- Superfamily: Noctuoidea
- Family: Erebidae
- Subfamily: Arctiinae
- Genus: Myrmecopsis
- Species: M. polistes

Binomial name
- Myrmecopsis polistes (Hübner, 1818)

Synonyms
- Pseudosphex polistes Hübner, 1818; Myrmecopsis eumenides Newman, 1850

Species of moth

Myrmecopsis polistes is a moth of the subfamily Arctiinae. It was described by Jacob Hübner in 1818. It is found in Mexico, Guatemala and Brazil (Amazonas, Tefé, Pará).
