= Myrmecopsis hyalozona =

Scientific classification
- Domain: Eukaryota
- Kingdom: Animalia
- Phylum: Arthropoda
- Class: Insecta
- Order: Lepidoptera
- Superfamily: Noctuoidea
- Family: Erebidae
- Subfamily: Arctiinae
- Genus: Myrmecopsis
- Species: M. hyalozona

Binomial name
- Myrmecopsis hyalozona (Felder, 1874)

Synonyms
- Sphecopsis hyalozona Felder, 1874

Species of moth

Myrmecopsis hyalozona is a moth of the subfamily Arctiinae. It was described by Felder in 1874. It is found in Colombia.
