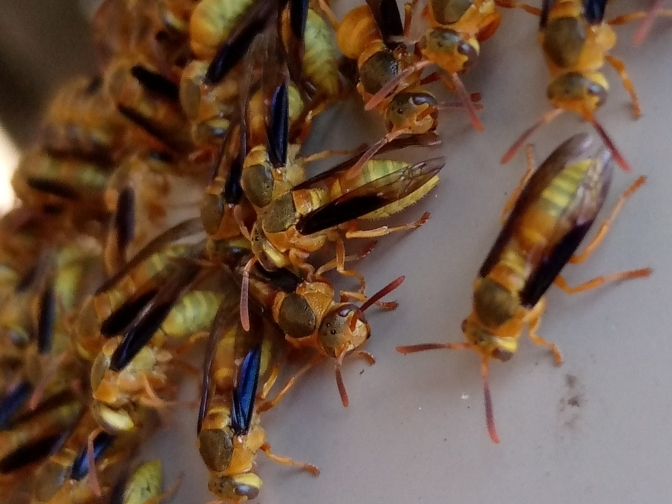

Scientific classification
- Kingdom: Animalia
- Phylum: Arthropoda
- Clade: Pancrustacea
- Class: Insecta
- Order: Hymenoptera
- Family: Vespidae
- Genus: Parachartergus
- Species: P. colobopterus

Binomial name
- Parachartergus colobopterus (Lichtenstein, 1796)

= Parachartergus colobopterus =

Species of wasp

Parachartergus colobopterus is an epiponine social wasp belonging to the subfamily Polistinae. This species can be found through Central and South America and is unique because its colonies contain multiple queens. However, relatedness among nest mates remains relatively high as a result of cyclical oligogyny, which is a system where the number of queens varies over time. Because workers and queens do not demonstrate any significant morphological differentiation, individuals of this species are totipotent, capable of differentiation into any caste, because caste is not genetically determined. Relatedness and conflict therefore play a major role in determining the dominance hierarchy and behavioral patterns of this wasp species, especially the behavior of worker policing. Another unique characteristic of this wasp is that it is generally a docile species: when the nest is continuously provoked, the colony members will leave the nest instead of mounting an attack.

== Taxonomy and phylogeny ==
Parachartergus colobopterus is an epiponine wasp – one of several tribes of Polistinae within the family Vespidae. There are 23 other genera and 200 species of epiponine wasps. This species was classified by Martin Hinrich Lichtenstein in 1796.

== Description and identification ==
Like other Neotropical wasps, workers are not morphologically different from queens. This means that workers and queens cannot be identified visually, but can be identified by the presence of mature eggs in their ovaries, as seen after dissection. Males are similar in appearance to females, but can be identified by their testes.

Colonies of P. colobopterus can be found on tree trunks and large branches. These nests grow vertically, so that the youngest combs are at the bottom of the nest. The envelope of the nest is not attached to the combs; instead, it is attached directly to the substrate.

== Distribution and habitat ==
Parachartergus colobopterus is a Neotropical wasp, with a range stretching through Central and South America. This wasp build nests on tree trunks or branches that are in or near forested areas.

== Colony cycle ==
When a colony relocates to a new nesting site, the workers and queens will follow a chemical trail laid by scouts that leads them as they swarm to the new site. Once the colony has arrived at the new site, workers will begin to construct the nest and the queen will begin to lay eggs, which are cared for by the workers. Colonies may be initiated at any time of the year, and may persist for several years or only for several generations of broods. Each colony has multiple queens. When there are only one or two queens left, young females initiate dominance displays in order to determine which females will become the colony's new queens. This multiple queen nesting structure is also seen in another South American wasp, Polybia emaciata .

== Behavior ==
=== Sociality ===
Parachartergus colobopterus, like other wasps, is a social insect. This wasp demonstrates social behaviors such as division of labor, alarm pheromones, trial pheromones, partitioning of tasks, and extended persistence of colonies. The individual wasps that make up a colony are divided into reproductive castes, where queens are able to mate and freely reproduce while workers care for young. Atypical of other eusocial wasp species, P. colobopterus has multiple queens. It can be difficult to explain the occurrence of sociality in populations where individuals are not necessarily directly related, such as this wasp. However, relatedness remains high enough that sociality is a beneficial strategy. P. colobopterus demonstrates that organisms do not necessarily need to have extreme differentiation between castes in order to maintain a successful, highly social system.

=== Cyclical oligogyny ===
Parachartergus colobopterus colonies have multiple queens and demonstrate a unique dominance hierarchy. New queens are produced periodically as part of a strategy called cyclical oligogyny. The patterns of conflict and relatedness in this wasp can call be traced back to this system of cyclical oligogyny. Queen number varies, fluctuating from high to low over the course of a colony's lifecycle. When queens age and the number of queens has been reduced to only one or two wasps, new queens will be produced by the colony. This increases the relatedness of the colony as a whole by increasing the relatedness between the queens. In some cases, too many females will attempt to be new queens and workers will then suppress some new queens. Since there are no morphological differences between queens and workers, any workers may vie with each other for the position of queen.

== Communication ==
Five types of interactions between P. colobopterus wasps have been identified. Wasps may antennate, or touch each other with their antennae. They also demonstrate feeding behavior, where a wasp bearing food will offer the food to another wasp. Wasps may use their mandibles to request a feeding by biting the mandibles of another wasp; additionally, they may use their mandibles to groom another wasp by carefully moving them the mandibles over their nest mate’s body. Finally, wasps may use their mandibles to attack each other by biting another wasp’s body. Together, these interactions form the basis of the behavior of P. colobopterus. Research has demonstrated that queens rarely engage in interactions with workers except to request a feeding, and do not appear to regulate worker behavior.

== Worker-queen conflict ==
=== Conflict over sex ratio ===
Like all other hymenopterans, P. colobopterus is haplodiploid. This means that unfertilized eggs will produce males, while fertilized eggs will produce females. Workers are therefore able to produce their own male offspring even though they have not been inseminated. Since each worker would be more closely related to her son than the male offspring of any other workers, it may be expected that the production of males would be a major source of conflict. However, workers are more closely related to the queens than to each other, meaning that they are therefore more closely related to the male offspring of the queens than the male offspring of other workers. The best strategy for workers is to suppress the reproduction of other workers and allow the queens to produce males.

=== Worker policing ===
In order to maximize their individual fitness, workers will try to reduce the reproduction of other wasps. This is known as worker policing. As previously mentioned, workers will attempt to suppress other workers. Worker policing also plays a large role in modulating the number of queens per colony. As cyclical oligogyny progresses, new queens will attempt to assert their dominance after the death of the old queens. Any worker could be morphologically able to function as a new queen, but the number of new queens is restricted by workers as they aggressively interact with potential new queens. This suppresses the development of the female’s ovaries, preventing her from becoming queen.

=== Conflict over egg laying ===
In many other wasp species, an individual's caste is determined morphologically; that is, workers are differentiated from queens and are physically unable to carry out the role of a queen. However, such morphological differences do not exist in P. colobopterus, and workers are therefore not physically restricted from reproducing. The consequence is that adult females compete with each other for queenhood. According to kin selection theory, since workers are able to reproduce, it would be advantageous to them to reproduce instead of rearing the offspring of the queens. However, it also benefits each worker to limit the reproduction of other workers. Therefore, if there are multiple active queens in a colony, workers will collectively suppress females.

== Life history ==
Data by Strassman et al. indicates that reproduction in P. colobopterus reaches a maximum during the rainy season. At these times, there is a high number of new queens and a trend of colony foundation. Colonies have been known to persist for an extended period of time – up to 4.5 years. Mortality has not been shown to be associated with stage in the queen cycle, nor with season. The overall mortality rate of P. colobopterus is not consistent with other social insects, since it has a decreased mortality rate early in the history of a colony; this is likely due to the fact that it is founded by a swarm, not just an individual queen. Since the success of the new colony is not completely dependent on the survival of the queen, this increases the colony’s initial chance of survival.

== Defense ==
Nests represent a highly concentrated supply of resources, which makes them desirable to predators. P. colobopterus wasps have a nonaggressive response when their nest is disturbed. After the initial provocation, wasps leave the nest and begin vigorous displays on its outer envelope. If the provocation continues, females will abandon the nest entirely, leaving the offspring behind. This unique behavior is particularly interesting because the females possess stings that could be used in colony defense. However, field observations indicate females will only sting in self-defense if directly attacked. There have been several theories proposed for the defense response of P. colobopterus, but it seems most likely that this response is due to the lack of vertebrate predation. Furthermore, the nests of these wasps are camouflaged by plant matter, which may further reduce the likelihood of vertebrate predation and negate the need for aggressive defense.

Parachartergus colobopterus exhibits a novel defensive behavior against vertebrates. When a predator comes near, instead of flying off and stinging the predator, the workers of this species bend their gaster around and actually spray venom at the predator, something that is likely to be effective particularly when it hits the eyes of the predator.
