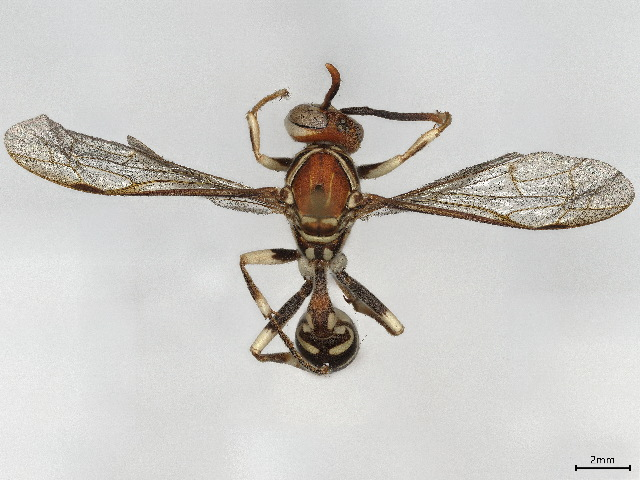
- Ropalidiini-Paper wasp (Polistinae)

Scientific classification
- Kingdom: Animalia
- Phylum: Arthropoda
- Clade: Pancrustacea
- Class: Insecta
- Order: Hymenoptera
- Family: Vespidae
- Subfamily: Polistinae
- Tribe: Ropalidiini
- Genus: Parapolybia; Saussure, 1854

Type species
- Parapolybia indica Saussure, 1854

Species
- Parapolybia escalerae (Meade-Waldo, 1911); Parapolybia indica Saussure, 1854; Parapolybia nodosa Vecht, 1966; Parapolybia persica (Meade-Waldo, 1911); Parapolybia varia (Fabricius, 1787)

= Parapolybia =

Genus of wasps

Parapolybia is a genus of paper wasp of the Ropalidiini tribe in the sub-family Polistinae of the family Vespidae which contains thirteen species from Iran in the west to Melanesia in the east.
