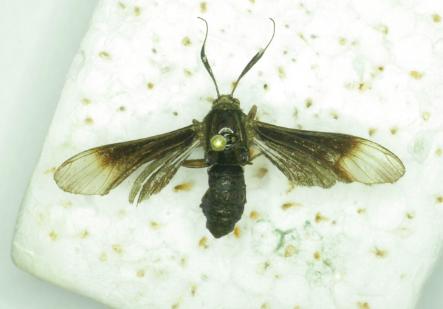
- Myrmecopsis strigosa

Scientific classification
- Kingdom: Animalia
- Phylum: Arthropoda
- Clade: Pancrustacea
- Class: Insecta
- Order: Lepidoptera
- Superfamily: Noctuoidea
- Family: Erebidae
- Subfamily: Arctiinae
- Tribe: Arctiini
- Subtribe: Euchromiina
- Genus: Myrmecopsis; Newman, 1850

Synonyms
- Sphecopsis Felder, 1874

= Myrmecopsis =

Genus of moths

Myrmecopsis is a genus of tiger moths in the family Erebidae. The genus was described by Newman in 1850.

== Species ==
- Myrmecopsis hyalozona (Felder, 1874)
- Myrmecopsis polistes (Hübner, 1818)
- Myrmecopsis strigosa (Druce, 1884)
