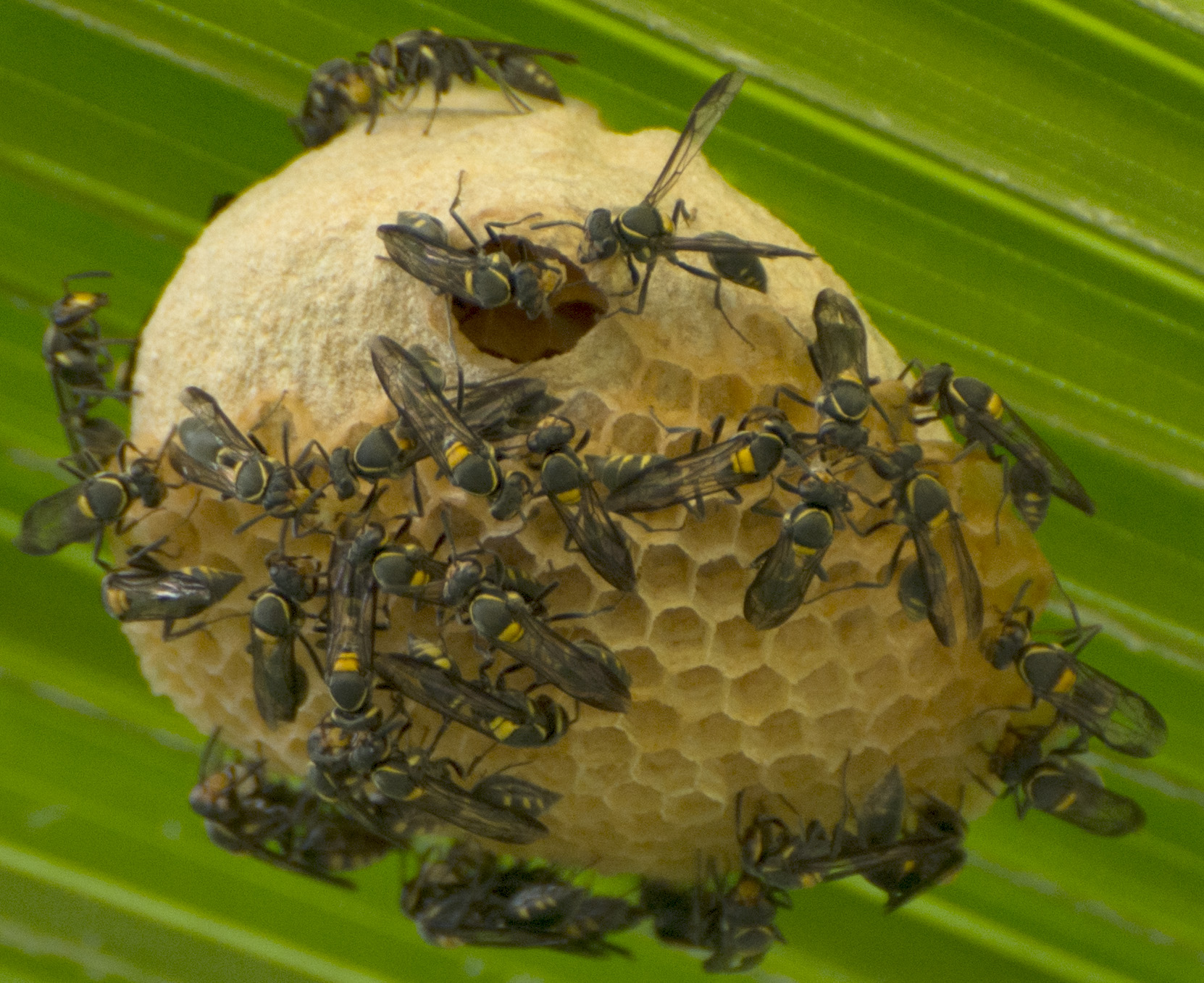
- Polybia sp. and nest

Scientific classification
- Kingdom: Animalia
- Phylum: Arthropoda
- Class: Insecta
- Order: Hymenoptera
- Family: Vespidae
- Subfamily: Polistinae
- Tribe: Epiponini; Lucas, 1867

Genera
- Apoica; Agelaia; Angiopolybia; Asteloeca; Brachygastra; Chartergellus; Charterginus; Chartergus; Clypearia; Epipona; Leipomeles; Metapolybia; Nectarinella; Parachartergus; Polybia; Protonectarina; Protopolybia; Pseudopolybia; Synoeca

Synonyms
- Polybiini

= Epiponini =

Tribe of wasps

The Epiponini (formerly known as Polybiini) are a large and diverse tribe of social wasps inhabiting the Neotropical region, with some species' ranges extending into the Nearctic region.

== Selected species ==
- Apoica pallens
- Leipomeles dorsata
- Parachartergus apicalis
- Parachartergus colobopterus
- Polybia sericea
- Protopolybia exigua
- Synoeca cyanea
- Brachygastra mellifica
