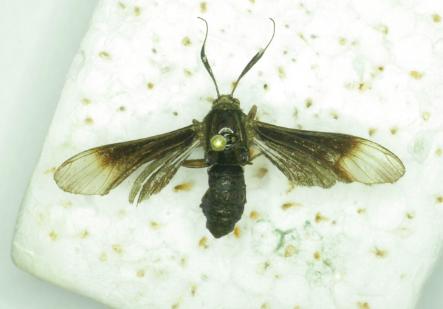

Scientific classification
- Domain: Eukaryota
- Kingdom: Animalia
- Phylum: Arthropoda
- Class: Insecta
- Order: Lepidoptera
- Superfamily: Noctuoidea
- Family: Erebidae
- Subfamily: Arctiinae
- Genus: Myrmecopsis
- Species: M. strigosa

Binomial name
- Myrmecopsis strigosa (H. Druce, 1884)

Synonyms
- Amycles strigosa H. Druce, 1884; Pseudosphex strigosa

= Myrmecopsis strigosa =

Species of moth

Myrmecopsis strigosa is a moth of the subfamily Arctiinae. It was described by Herbert Druce in 1884. It is found in Mexico and Guatemala. The wingspan is about 25 mm.

It is thought to be a Müllerian mimic of the wasp Parachartergus apicalis, with predators paying a high penalty for mistaking M. strigosa for the wasp and there is a small reward from correctly identifying it since M. strigosa is bitter tasting and covered in scales.
