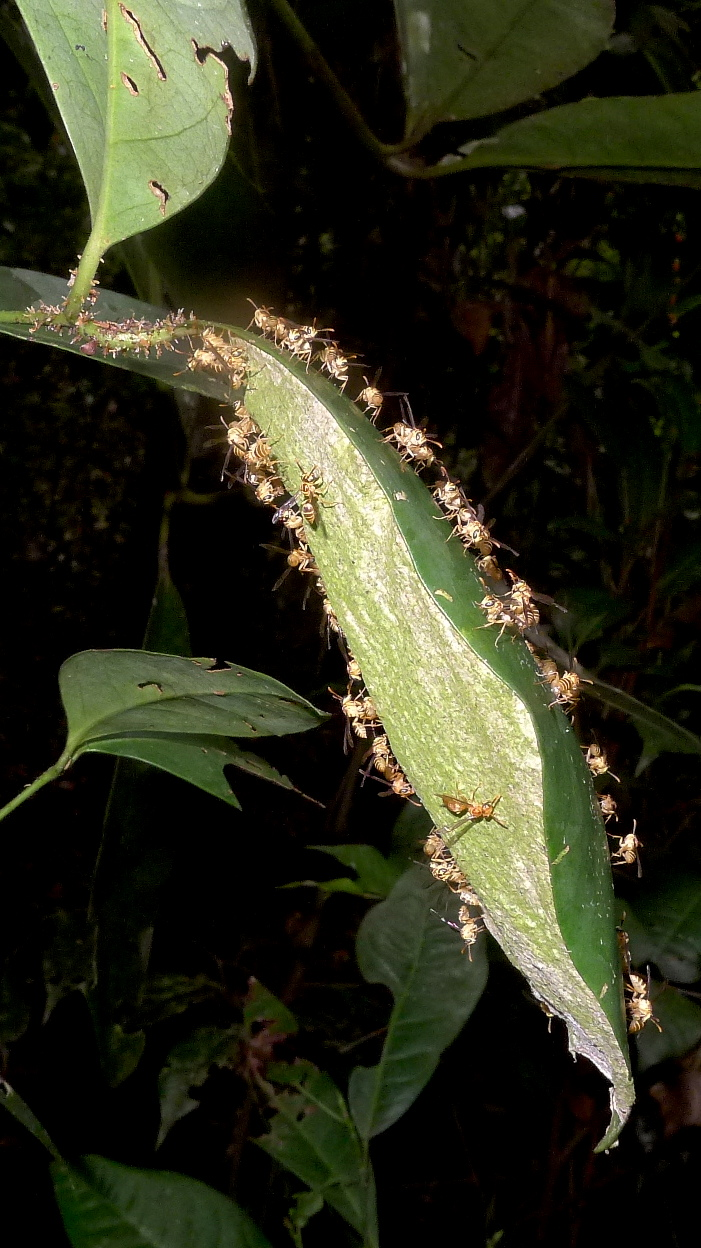

Scientific classification
- Kingdom: Animalia
- Phylum: Arthropoda
- Clade: Pancrustacea
- Class: Insecta
- Order: Hymenoptera
- Family: Vespidae
- Genus: Leipomeles
- Species: L. dorsata

Binomial name
- Leipomeles dorsata (Fabricius, 1804)

= Leipomeles dorsata =

Species of wasp

Leipomeles dorsata is a neotropical paper wasp that is found across Central America and northern South America. It is a eusocial wasp with little differentiation between reproducing and non-reproducing females. In fact, workers can become temporary reproductives if the main reproductives are killed, allowing reproduction to continue until the main reproductive population recovers. The colony cycles through different ratios of main reproductive females and subordinate reproductive females, starting with few or no primary reproducing females, and increasing until there are only main reproductives.

== Taxonomy and phylogeny ==
Leipomeles dorsata is part of the tribe Epiponini, a group of neotropical eusocial wasps. This species has a complex taxonomic history. Other species have been synonymized into this species, the first being by Fabricus in 1804. The initial classification of the species Polybia nana became Leipomeles nana in 1912 and was eventually synonymized with L. dorsata. L. nana was the junior synonym and L. dorsata is the senior synonym. However, L. nana has since been reclassified as its own distinct species, Leipomeles spilogastra, and is no longer a synonym of L. dorsata.

== Description and identification ==
Leipomeles dorsata females are a variety of colors, varying between chestnut to dark brown. Shade generally varies with age, with individuals becoming darker in color as they get older. However, egg-laying females sometimes exhibit yellow patterns on the head and thorax. The abdomens of this species are generally an elongated diamond-like shape and the wings have a flattened semi-circular shape.

=== Nest Identification ===
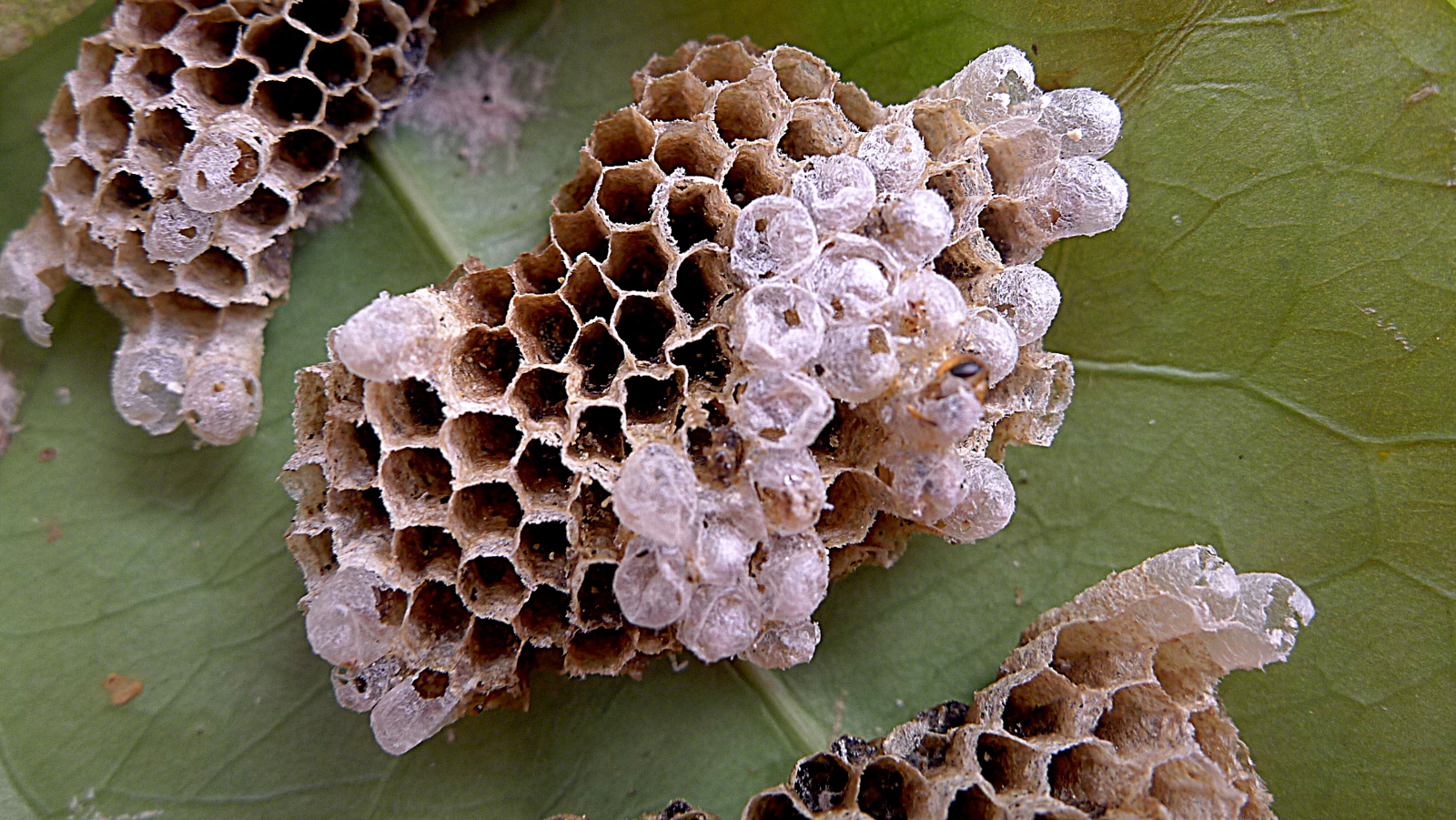
A piece of L. dorsata nest

Leipomeles dorsata nests are made of extremely thin material classified as paper. These nests may or may not have a petiole. If there is a petiole present it is covered in a sticky substance that protects the nest against ants, which are brood predators. The nests are a series of combs underneath the leaf, and may be fused. Generally, this species applies colored pulp to the outside of the nest, thought to be a method of camouflage.

== Distribution and habitat ==
Leipomeles dorsata is a neotropical species present in the rainforests of Central and South America. They build their nests on the underside of large tree leaves, making them extremely adapted to a niche of the rainforest habitat. It is mainly found in the lowland areas of these forests from 50 to 500m elevations. Large scale morphological studies rely mostly on collections from Costa Rica.

== Colony cycle ==
This species has a distinct colony cycle, with primary egglayers only being part of the colony for a limited amount of time. Reproductives of L. dorsata consist of primary yellow egg layers and subordinate brown egg layers. The yellow females have longer ovaries than the brown females. This is likely due to the brown egglayers being former worker wasps that have become egg layers in the colony. All of the yellow egg layers are older females, but there is usually a mix between ages in the brown egg layers. This occurs when a colony is deprived of its yellow egg layers, the brown workers are signaled to become replacements, an example of cyclical oligogyny. Eventually, the older yellow egg layer population recovers and the workers aggressively prevent other females from becoming egg layers.

== Behavior ==
=== Reproductive suppression ===
When the population of primary egg layers is robust, workers aggressively suppress reproduction by other workers. This aggression is exhibited between nest mates, through denying food and physically biting rivals. Older mature primary egglayers will suppress reproduction in the younger brown egglayer population. However, if the colony begins losing its primary reproductives then it is advantageous for the colony if the subordinate (brown) egg layers reproduce, and they will do so since they are no longer suppressed by the yellow egglayers.

=== Communication ===
Leipomeles dorsata display trail marking during colony migration, which is rather common for neotropical swarming wasps. The scouts will drag or rub the underside of their bodies on surfaces, such as leaves along the migration route. However, what makes L. dorsata unique is that it lacks the Richard's Organ, which is generally associated with pheromone production in other species that exhibit this behavior.

=== Mating behavior ===
As is the case of most Epiponini wasps, the reproductives stay in the nest, which requires males to find their way into the nest to mate. An explanation for the male's ability to find potential mates is that they patrol for mates and follow colony migration pheromones that were laid down by scouts to new nest sites. In fact, males have been sighted at L. dorsata colonies as soon as the first day of nest construction. In addition, males then might also be attracted by reproductives' own pheromones inside of the nest, and use those to find their way into the nest to mate.

== Kin selection ==
=== Worker queen conflict ===
Leipomeles dorsata is a species that does not have queens per se, but rather multiple egg layers that are in charge of reproduction. The degree that these egg layers are specialized for reproduction depends on how functional their ovaries are. There are four patterns of ovaries that were observed in this species: no oocytes, immature oocytes, well-developed oocytes with at least one mature oocyte, and several well-developed and completely mature oocytes. The females with the more mature reproductive organs are the ones that have greater reproductive success because they are more specialized; in cases where there are both brown worker egg-layers with the third reproductive pattern and yellow reproductives with the fourth reproductive pattern, the yellow females out perform and outcompete the brown ones. However, if there are no yellow females present than the brown workers may be solely responsible for the colony's reproduction.

== Life history ==
=== Colony survivorship ===
Leipomeles dorsata has several qualities that allow for high colony survivorship. The main quality is that they display cyclical oligogyny. This allows workers to temporarily take the place of egg layers when there are few or no egglayers, allowing the population to survive during a period of high egglayer mortality. Also the ability of male Epiponini to find nests with virgin females contributes to colony survivorship. This ensures that copulation can take place in colonies where there has been loss of reproductives which guarantees the reproductive success of the colony.

== Camouflage ==
Leipomeles dorsata builds its nests in a way that disguises it from vertebrae predators. They choose an overhanging leaf and build the nest underneath it so that it is hidden, and then proceed to construct an envelope that mimics the color and patterns of the leaves surrounding the nest. This mimicry results from the addition of colored leave pulp. Wasps chew up leaves on the surrounding tree, and then applied the resulting mixture to the outside of the nest.

== Interaction with other species ==
=== Predators and predation ===
Leipomeles dorsata, as with other paper wasps mainly feed on insects and other arthropods that they find by foraging. The main predators of L. dorsata, as with other neotropical paper wasps, are ants and birds that feed on a variety of insects. Specifically, army ants present a grave threat to paper wasps in the tropics, and nests and behaviors have evolved as a way to combat this predation pressure; in the case of L. dorsata, this is seen in the chemical defense described below.

=== Defense ===
In the case of L. dorsata, defense is passive rather than active. Nest petioles are covered in a sticky substance that protects the nest and the larva inside from ants. This protection is perhaps the reason that this species has extremely docile females. In many species that employ this method, the small size of the wasps requires alternate defense systems rather than aggression. Other examples include chemical defense and large numbers of adults at the foundational stage.
