= Parapolybia nodosa =

Scientific classification
- Kingdom: Animalia
- Phylum: Arthropoda
- Clade: Pancrustacea
- Class: Insecta
- Order: Hymenoptera
- Family: Vespidae
- Genus: Parapolybia
- Species: P. nodosa

Binomial name
- Parapolybia nodosa Vecht, 1966

Species of wasp

Parapolybia nodosa is a species of paper wasp in the family Vespidae, that was described by Jacobus van der Vecht in 1966. It is recorded from Hong Kong and other parts of tropical Asia, where it builds nests in urban and forested habitats.

== Taxonomy ==
Parapolybia nodosa was described by Dutch entomologist Jacobus van der Vecht in 1966 from specimens collected in the Oriental region, distinguishing it from related species like P. varia by features of the propodeum, metasoma, and forewing venation.

In Hong Kong, it is known by the Chinese name 叉胸異腹胡蜂.

== Description ==
Like other Parapolybia, P. nodosa is a small-sized social wasp with a slender brown-and-yellow body. Females have brown body with pale yellow markings.

== Range ==
Parapolybia nodosa ranges from India through Southeast Asia to Taiwan, including Thailand and Hong Kong.

== Habitat ==
In Hong Kong, it is reported to inhabit shaded areas with dense vegetation, where nests attach to undersides of broad leaves, small branches, or fronds. Colony sizes are small, rarely exceeding 100 workers.

== Ecology ==
This species is a generalist predator and scavenger; adults feed on tree sap such as from Citrus species and extrafloral nectaries of plants like Ricinus communis and Mallotus paniculatus. Nests are open, asymmetrical paper combs made from masticated plant fibers, starting with an eccentric pedicel and becoming tubular, with loosely woven white cocoon caps that later turn brown. Individuals apply chemical ant repellents to the nest pedicel and substrate. The queen monopolizes egg-laying by preventing any attempt of oviposition by a subordinate worker physically.
