= Chartergellus =

Scientific classification
- Domain: Eukaryota
- Kingdom: Animalia
- Phylum: Arthropoda
- Class: Insecta
- Order: Hymenoptera
- Family: Vespidae
- Subfamily: Polistinae
- Tribe: Epiponini
- Genus: Chartergellus; J. Becquaert, 1938

Species
- See text

Genus of wasps

Chartergellus is a genus of eusocial wasps of Epiponini with ten described species. The range of the species within this genus extends from Costa Rica to southeastern Brazil. The genus was described by J. Becquaert in 1938.

== Species ==
- Chartergellus afoveatus Cooper 1993
- Chartergellus amazonicus Richards 1978
- Chartergellus atectus Richards 1978
- Chartergellus communis Richards 1978
- Chartergellus frontalis (Fabricius 1804)
- Chartergellus jeannei Andena and Soleman 2015
- Chartergellus nigerrimus Richards 1978
- Chartergellus punctatior Richards 1978
- Chartergellus sanctus Richards 1978
- Chartergellus zonatus (Spinosa 1851)
