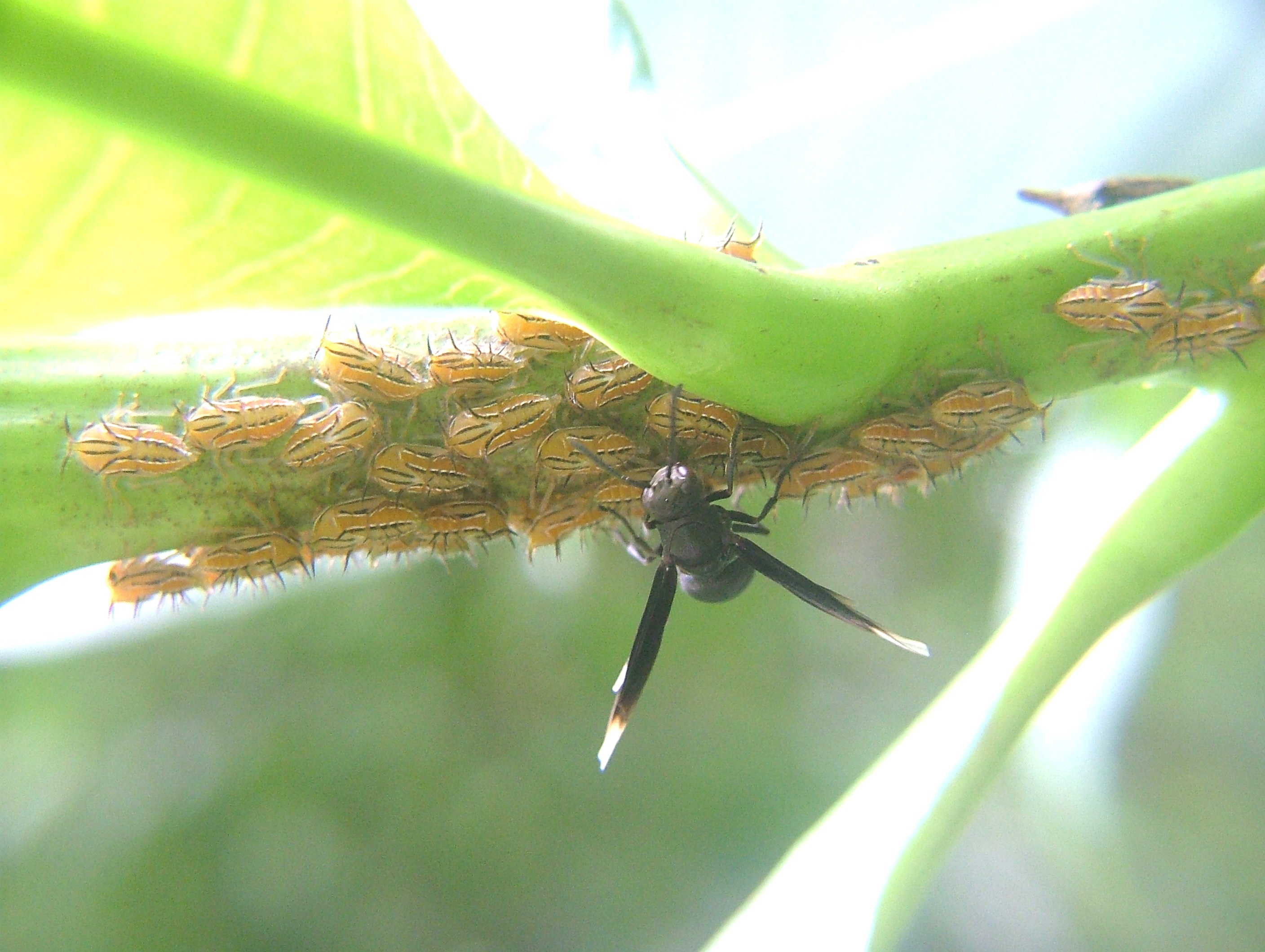
- Parachartergus sp. tending treehopper nymphs

Scientific classification
- Kingdom: Animalia
- Phylum: Arthropoda
- Class: Insecta
- Order: Hymenoptera
- Family: Vespidae
- Subfamily: Polistinae
- Tribe: Epiponini
- Genus: Parachartergus; R. von Ihering, 1904

= Parachartergus =

Genus of wasps

Parachartergus is a genus of epiponine social wasps belonging to the subfamily Polistinae.

== Species ==
There are 17 described species of Parachartergus:

- Parachartergus amazonensis Ducke, 1905
- Parachartergus apicalis (Fabricius, 1804) - known to form mutualistic relationships with treehoppers. The male genitalia are noted for their movements of "startling complexity".
- Parachartergus apicaloides Willink, 1959
- Parachartergus aztecus Willink, 1959
- Parachartergus colobopterus (Lichtenstein, 1796) - unusually nests contain several queens. The species is docile, preferring to leave the nest than mount an attack.
- Parachartergus flavofasciatus (Cameron, 1906)
- Parachartergus fraternus (Gribodo, 1892) - closely related to P. apicalis and also forms mutualistic relationships with treehoppers
- Parachartergus fulgidipennis (de Saussure, 1854)
- Parachartergus griseus (Fox, 1898)
- Parachartergus lenkoi Richards, 1978
- Parachartergus pacificus Cooper, 2000
- Parachartergus pseudoapicalis Willink, 1951
- Parachartergus richardsi Willink, 1951
- Parachartergus smithii (de Saussure, 1854)
- Parachartergus tomentus Willink, 1959
- Parachartergus weyrauchi du Buysson, 1904
- Parachartergus wagneri Willink, 1959

== Gallery ==
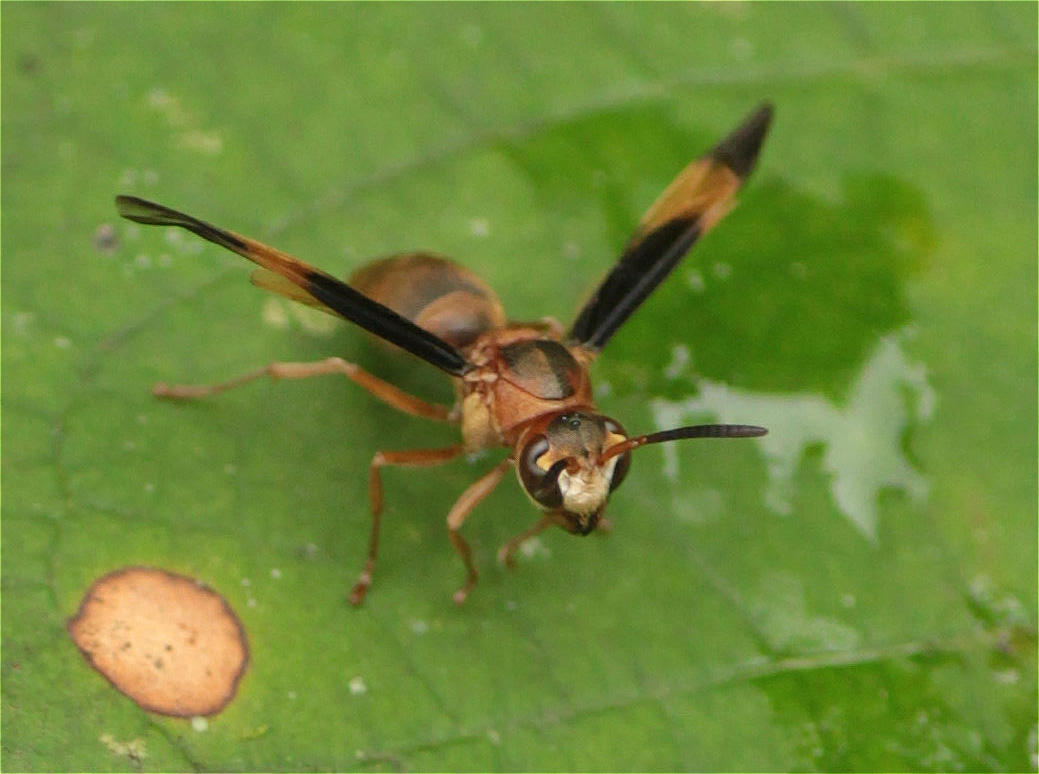
Parachartergus amazonensis

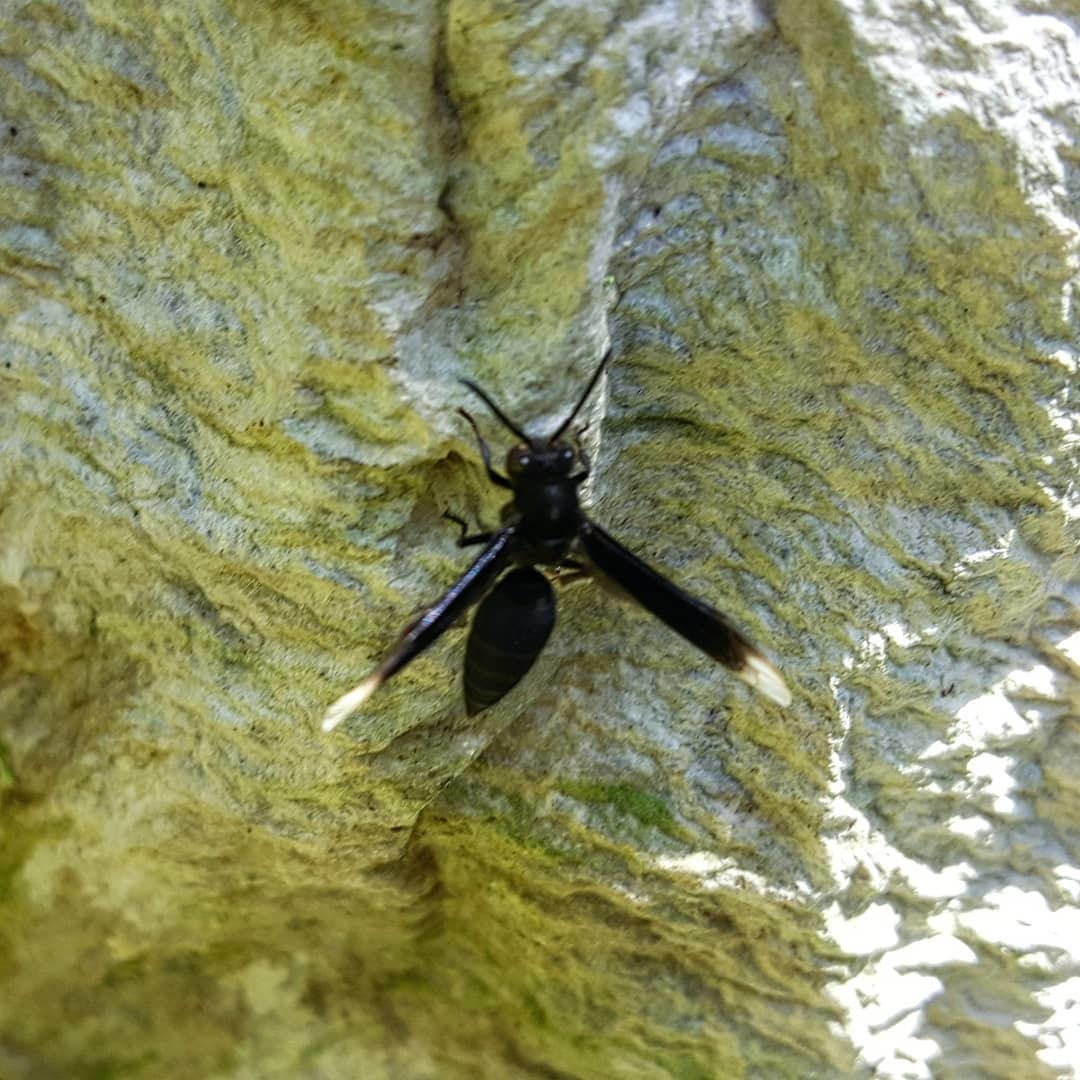
Parachartergus apicalis

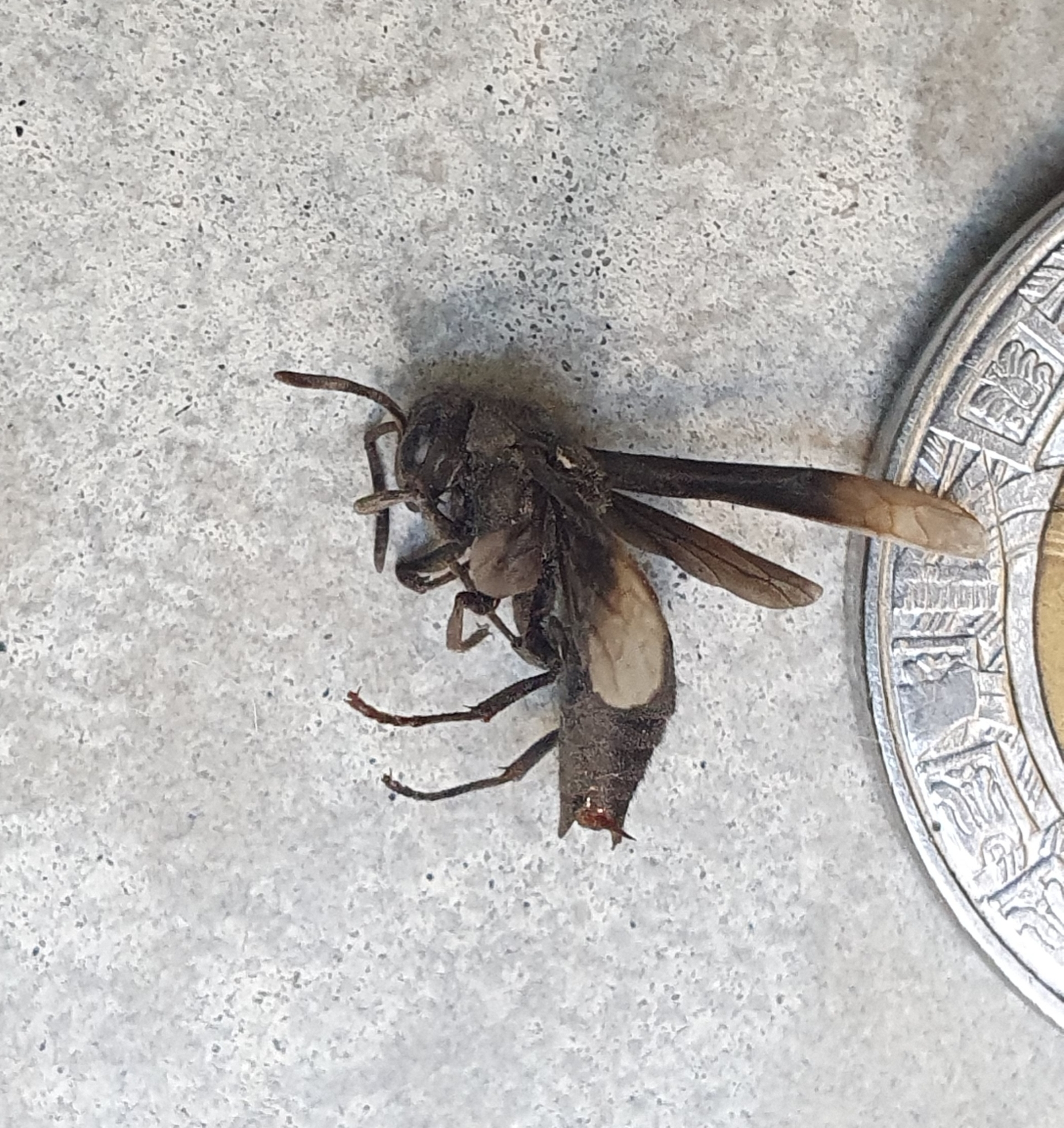
Parachartergus apicaloides

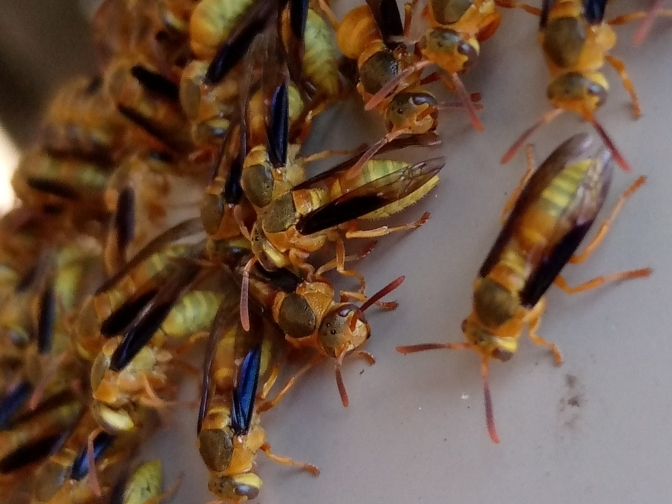
Parachartergus colobopterus

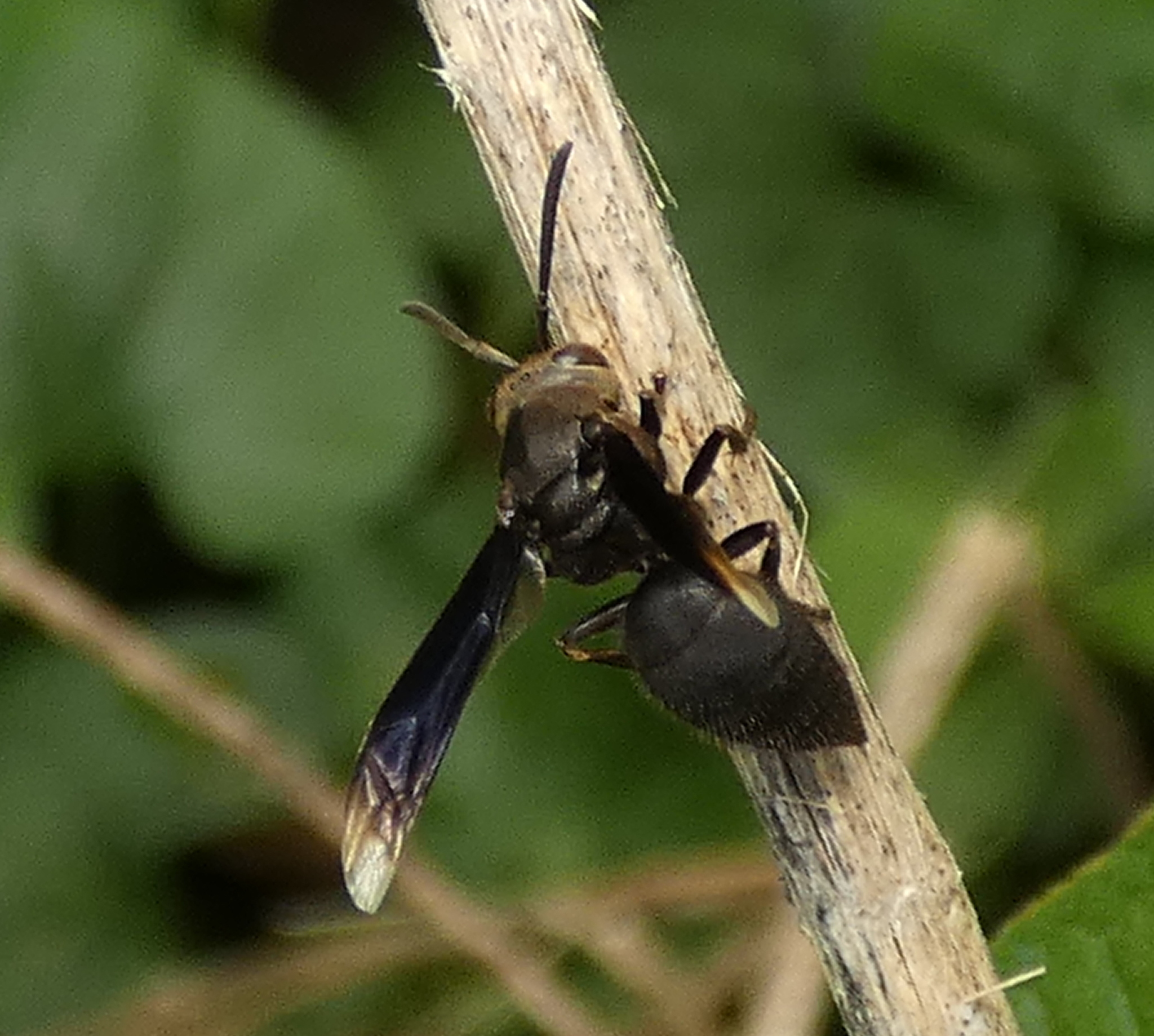
Parachartergus fraternus

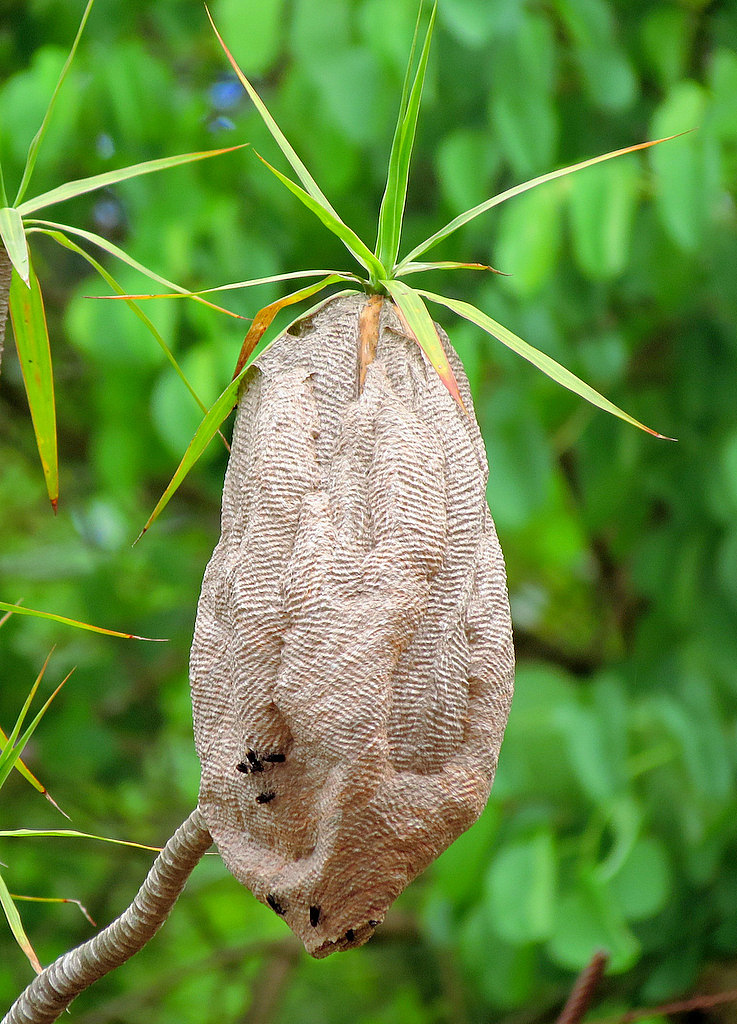
Parachartergus fraternus nest

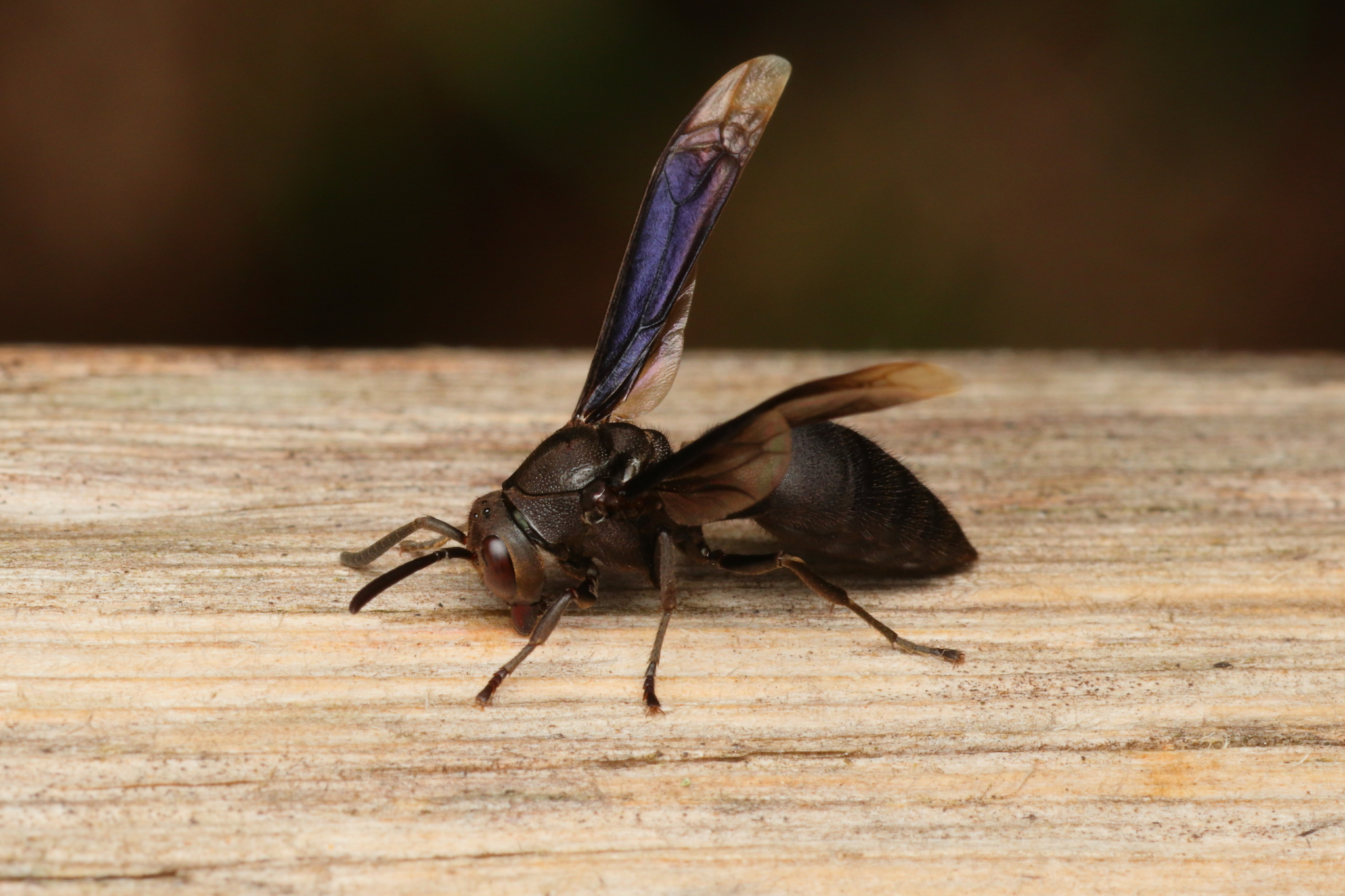
Parachartergus pseudapicalis

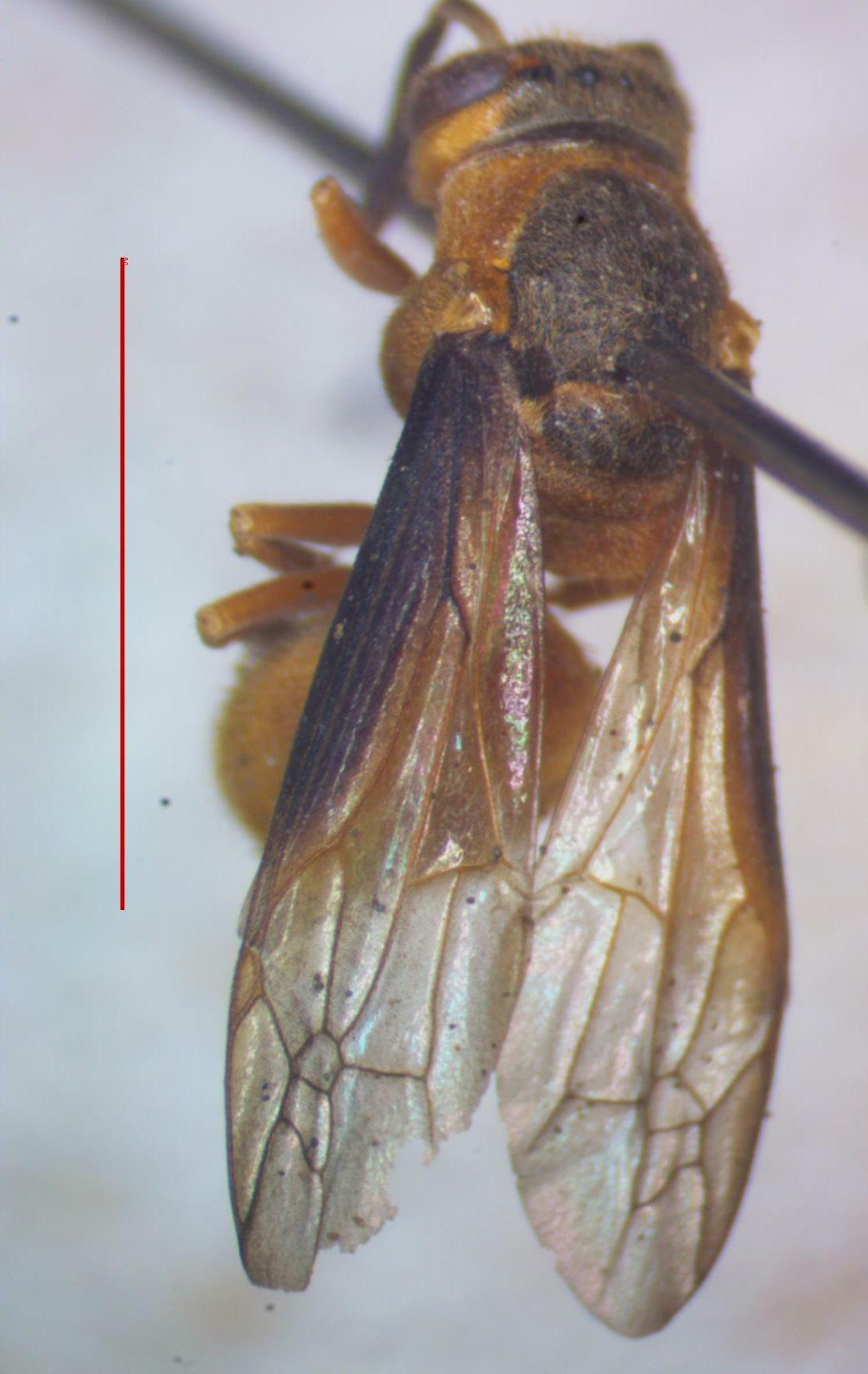
Parachartergus smithii
