= Trophallaxis =

Transfer of food between members of a community through stomodeal or proctodeal means

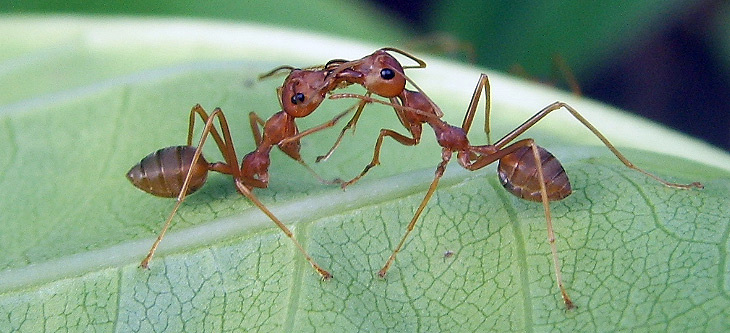
Trophallaxis in Asian-Australian weaver ant O. smaragdina, Thailand

Trophallaxis (/ˌtroʊfəˈlæksɪs/) is the direct transfer of fluid and food (excreted, secreted or regurgitated) between individuals, typically through mouth-to-mouth (stomodeal) or anus-to-mouth (proctodeal) feeding. Along with nutrients, trophallaxis can involve the transfer of molecules such as proteins, hormones, organisms such as symbionts, and information to serve as a form of communication. Trophallaxis is used by some birds, gray wolves, vampire bats, and is most highly developed in eusocial insects such as ants, wasps, bees, and termites. Like lactation, trophallaxis transmits socially transferred materials between bodies.

== Etymology ==
Trophallaxis is derived from Greek trophé, meaning 'nourishment' and allaxis, meaning 'exchange'. The word was introduced by the entomologist William Morton Wheeler in 1918. Wheeler's original conception was much broader than often recognized. He described the evolution of trophallaxis as an "ever-widening vortex" that began as a mutual trophic relation between parent and offspring but expanded to encompass increasingly complex relationships.

== Evolutionary significance ==
Phylogenetic analyses show that trophallaxis has played a major role in evolutionary diversification within ants. Trophallaxis evolved in ant lineages around 130 and 90 million years ago, coinciding with the rise of flowering plants that provided new liquid food sources like nectar and honeydew. Lineages that evolved trophallaxis showed higher net diversification rates compared to non-trophallactic lineages. The evolution of trophallaxis was strongly linked to reduced reproductive conflict within colonies and enabled the evolution of larger, more complex societies. This behavior, whether between adults or as a way to feed young, appears to have been a key innovation that contributed to the ecological dominance of this major social insect lineage, facilitating efficient resource distribution, large colony sizes, high dimorphism between queens and workers, complex communication through shared fluids, and sophisticated division of labor across thousands of individuals.

Trophallaxis was used in the past to support theories on the origin of sociality in insects. The Swiss psychologist and entomologist Auguste Forel also believed that food sharing was key to ant society and he used an illustration of it as the frontispiece for his book The Social World of the Ants Compared with that of Man. Proctodeal trophallaxis allowed termites to transfer cellulolytic flagellates that made the digestion of wood possible and efficient. Besides sociality, trophallaxis has evolved within many species as a method of nourishment for adults and/or juveniles, kin survival, transfer of symbionts, transfer of immunity, colony recognition and foraging communication. Trophallaxis has even evolved as a parasitic strategy in some species to obtain food from their host. Trophallaxis can also result in the spreading of chemicals, such as pheromones, throughout a colony, which is significant in social colony functioning.

Species have evolved anatomy to allow them to participate in trophallaxis, such as the proventriculus in the crops of Formica fusca ants. This structure acts as a valve to enhance food storage capacity. Likewise, the honey bee Apis mellifera is able to protrude their proboscis and sip nectar from the open mandibles of the donor bee. Certain mechanisms have also evolved to initiate food sharing, such as the sensory exploitation strategy that has evolved in the common cuckoo brood parasites. These birds have evolved brightly coloured gapes that stimulate the host to transfer food.

== Invertebrates ==
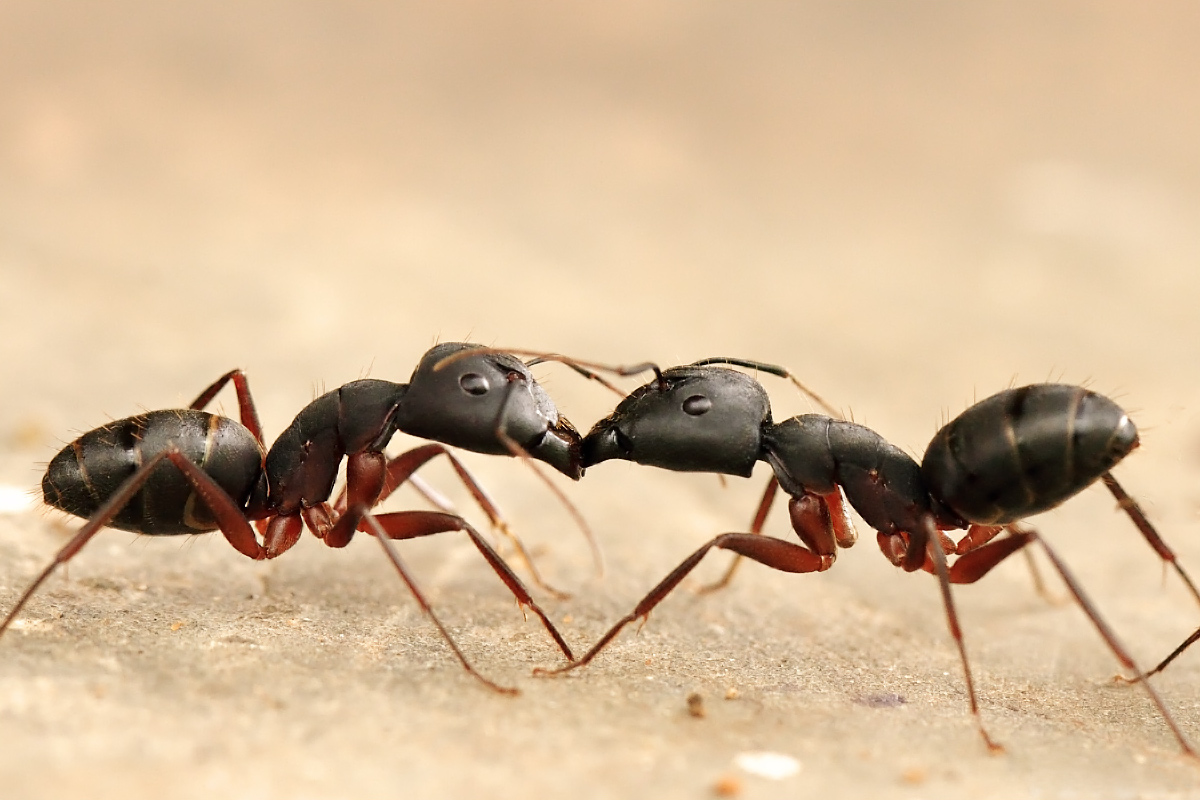
Trophallaxis in carpenter ants Camponotus sp.

Trophallaxis is a form of social feeding in many insects that contributes to collective metabolism in some cases and the formation of social bonds in others. It has been suggested that it may have evolved to reduce or avoid aggression from nest mates. Trophallaxis serves as a means of communication, at least in bees, like M. genalis, and ants. Trophallaxis in M. genalis is part of a social exchange system, where dominant bees are usually the recipients of food. It increases longevity of bees that have less access to food and decreases aggression between nest mates. In the red fire ant, colony members store food in their crops and regularly exchange this food with other colony members and larvae to form a sort of "communal stomach" for the colony. This is also true for certain species of Lasioglossum, such as the sweat bee Lasioglossum hemichalceum. L. hemichalceum will often exchange food with other members regardless of whether they are nestmates or not. This is because cooperation among non-relatives offers more benefit than cost to the group.

Many wasps, like Protopolybia exigua and Belonogaster petiolata, exhibit foraging behavior where adults perform trophallaxis with adults and between adults and larvae. P. exigua carry nectar, wood pulp and macerated prey in its crop from the field to the nest for transfer; for larvae survival they carry amounts of prey proportional to the amount of larvae in the nest. Voluntary trophallaxis in Xylocopa pubescens bees has led to the nest guarding behavior that the species is known for. This bee species allows one adult to forage and bring nectar back for the rest of the nest population as a way to continually defend the nest while obtaining nutrients for all members of the colony.

In termites, proctodeal trophallaxis is crucial for replacing the gut endosymbionts that are lost after every molt. Gut symbionts are also transferred by anal trophallaxis in wood-eating termites and cockroaches. Transfer of gut symbionts in these species is essential to digest wood as their food source. Carpenter ants transfer immunity through trophallaxis by the direct transfer of antimicrobial substances, increasing disease resistance and social immunity of the colony.

In some species of ants, it may play a role in spreading the colony odour that identifies members, though this has been debated.

Honey bee foragers use trophallaxis in associative learning to form long-term olfactory memories, in order to teach nest mates foraging behavior and where to search for food. Beyond these well-characterized functions, trophallaxis also forms an extensive social network connecting most colony members through chains of liquid transfer, but the significance of this network remains unknown.

In addition, Vespula austriaca wasps also engage in trophallaxis as a form of parasitism with its host to obtain nutrients. V. austriaca is an obligate parasite species that invades the nests of host species and obtains food by constraining the host with their legs and forcing trophallaxis.

== Vertebrates ==
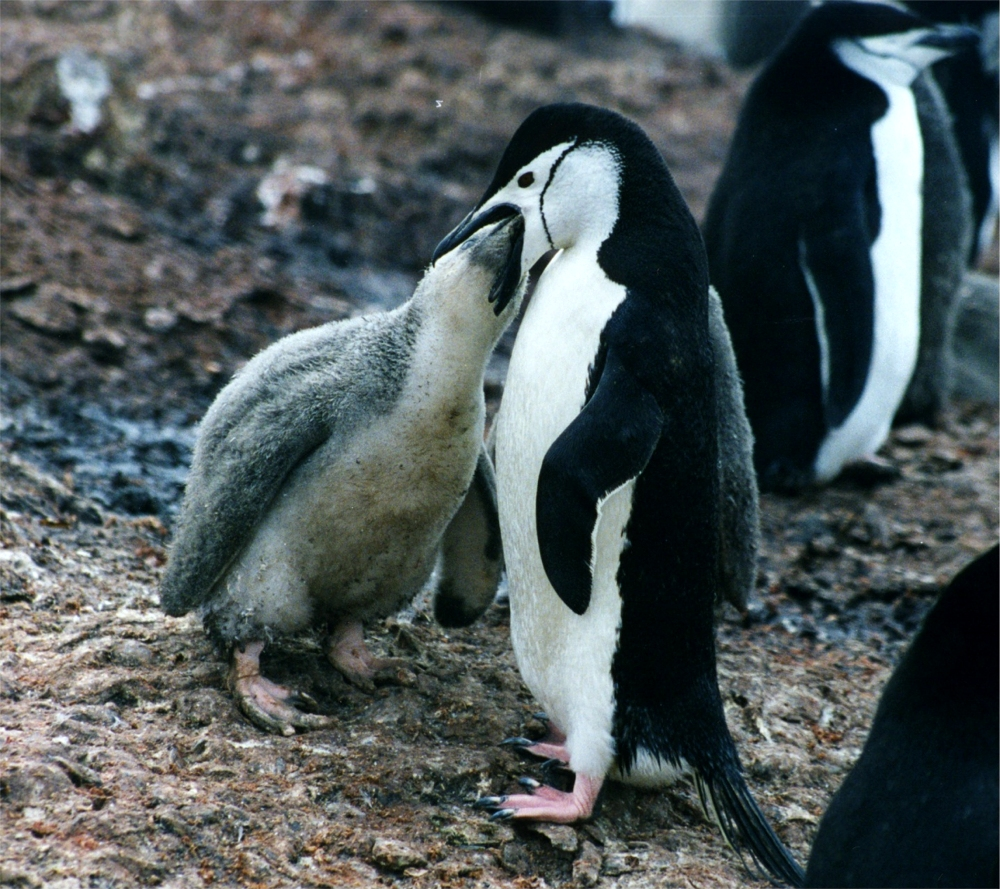
Food sharing between parent and chick chinstrap penguins Pygoscelis antarctica.

Vertebrates such as some bird species, gray wolves, and vampire bats also feed their young through regurgitation of food as a form of trophallaxis. Food sharing in vertebrates is a form of reciprocity demonstrated by many social vertebrates.

Wild wolves transport food in their stomach to pups and/or breeding females and share it by regurgitation, as a form of trophallaxis. The recipient wolves often lick or sniff the donor wolf's muzzle to activate regurgitation and receive nutrients. Vampire bats share blood with kin by regurgitation as a means of increasing their fitness through kin selection.

Birds regurgitate food and directly transfer it into the mouths of their offspring as a part of parental care, such as the "crop milk" that is transferred by mother ring doves into the mouths of their young. The cuckoo brood parasite is another bird species that engages in trophallaxis. The cuckoo bird uses mimicry, such as mimicking the eggshell colors and patterns of the host's eggs, to place their young in the nest of host species where they will be fed and reared at no expense to the cuckoo mother. The cuckoo young can often mimic the begging call of an entire nest of the host species' young and have evolved intensely colored gapes; both of which act as supernormal stimuli, inducing the host bird to deliver food to them over their own young via trophallaxis.

== See also ==
- Evolutionary models of food sharing
- Regurgitation
- Superorganism
