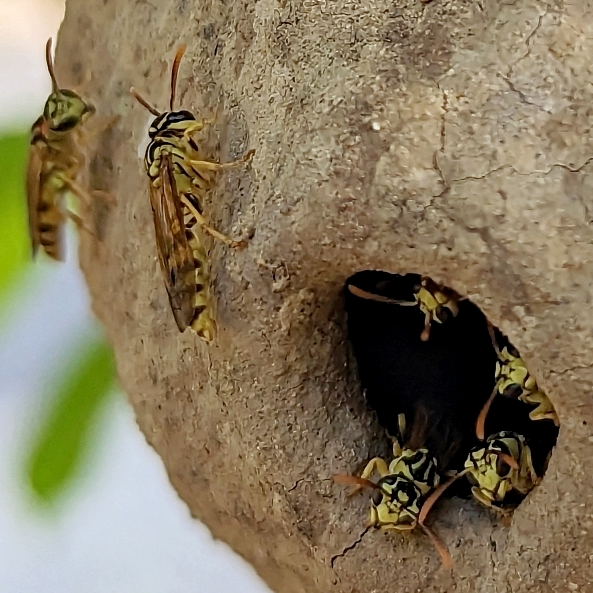

Scientific classification
- Kingdom: Animalia
- Phylum: Arthropoda
- Clade: Pancrustacea
- Class: Insecta
- Order: Hymenoptera
- Family: Vespidae
- Tribe: Epiponini
- Genus: Polybia
- Subgenus: Pedothoeca
- Species: P. emaciata

Binomial name
- Polybia emaciata Lucas, 1879

= Polybia emaciata =

Species of wasp

Polybia emaciata is a Neotropical swarm founding wasp that is mainly found in South America. This eusocial species has a unique colony structure in which multiple queens are present. Workers and queens are not morphologically distinct, but the high amount of relatedness maintained in the colony ensures that workers police each other. Polybia emaciata relies on a diet of liquid nectars which is supplemented with prey insects, particularly flies. It is well known for being one of only three wasp species in the genus Polybia that uses mud as the primary material for building its nest. Polybia emaciata is one of the least aggressive wasp species in the genus Polybia, and is known for its distinctive defensive behavior.

== Taxonomy and phylogeny ==
Polybia emaciata is part of the family Vespidae and the genus Polybia. It is one of 56 other species in the genus. This species is similar in appearance to many other species in the genus; however, it has a distinctive method of nest making. Unlike most other Polybia species, P. emaciata uses mud to build its nest instead of using plant resources. Other than its use of mud in nest making, it is similar in appearance to many other species in the genus. Other wasps in the species use plant resources to build their nest.

== Description and identification ==
Polybia emaciata shares many morphological characteristics with Polybia singularis, another neotropical wasp species. The main differentiating aspect of this species is not its physical appearance but its nesting structure, which is famous for its closed pear shape and single circular opening at the bottom.

=== Workers ===
A unique characteristic of Polybia emaciata is that there are no distinct morphological differences between workers and queens. This causes caste totipotency, which means that any female could have the potential to become a queen. Small factors like head size have been identified as minor differences but the difference in head size is almost negligible. Worker head size is about 1.3 times bigger than queen head size.

=== Queens ===
Polybia emaciata is polygynous, which means that multiple queens will simultaneously occupy the same nest. However, not all of the queens end up reproducing and mating with males. As the number of males in a colony increases, the number of queens decreases. Queen number is highest when it is not time to reproduce, but as reproduction approaches the number of queens decreases.

=== Males ===
Males found in Polybia emaciata nests are usually very young, which suggests that they are just coming into adulthood when they mate and then eventually leave the nest. During the reproductive time period in the nest all males are very young, which suggests that the older males have gone elsewhere and that these males were born in the nest. Males will be produced only when the number of queens in the nest is low. Therefore, males are produced during reproductive times.

== Nests ==
Nests are often pear shaped and made primarily out of mud. Polybia emaciata nest are well known for having only one circular opening in the nest through which all wasps enter and exit. This allows for a unique defensive behavior, which is discussed later on in the defense section.

=== Nest size ===
Nest can measure up to 9 cm by 8 cm and they are usually found around plants that produce sweet nectar; for example, Polybia emaciata nests are commonly found on or near guava plants. The proximity of Polybia emaciata nests to nectar-producing plants is beneficial because nectar and fluids make up 53.2% of their diets. Moreover, these areas typically have a high concentration of prey insects that comprise a large part of the wasp's diet.

== Distribution and habitat ==
=== Habitat ===
Polybia emaciata mainly occupies South America in tropical climates, where fruit and predation is abundant. They are found in many South American countries such as Colombia, Venezuela, Brazil, and Argentina. Nests are built mainly around pastures and fruit crops on the branches of plants and trees. This is because their nests are energetically costly and it is best for them to build them where there are plenty of resources. Polybia emaciata is a fairly common species and has been used abundantly in the study of eusocial wasps.

== Colony cycle ==
Polybia emaciata are tropical swarm founding wasps with multiple queens. They have a life history very similar to that of Parachartergus colobopterus, another neotropical swarm founding wasp species. Like P. colobopterus, Polybia emaciata has multiple queens per colony.

=== Colony initiation ===
New colonies are founded by new queens and hundreds of workers moving to find a new nest site. At this time some queens can lose their position as queen and will become intermediates that function as workers. Since the number of individuals in a colony is limited by nest size, the amount of queens in a colony has been seen to vary with nest size. Due to the tropical environment and the species location close to the equator there is no seasonal change for the wasps. Colony initiation happens whenever new queens are born. Each colony starts with a few queens and distantly related workers, and as time goes by the number of queens reduces while the relatedness of the nest increases. When this happens males will be produced and subsequently new queens who must then go out and found new nest. Colony size can range from about 70 to about 600 inhabitants, depending on the size of the nest and the size of the founding swarm.

== Behavior ==
=== Dominance hierarchy ===
There are multiple queens in every Polybia emaciata nest, which means that there is no true dominant queen. However, due to a high degree of kin selection and altruism present in this species, most of the wasps in the nest are still very related. There is some evidence that during the formation of a new nest, queens that lose dominance competitions become workers and lose their ability to lay eggs.

=== Division of labor ===
While there are many queens in a given nest, the number of queens usually doesn't surpass around 30. However, there have been cases when there are much more than 30, and that number is often far below the number of workers that are usually present. There can be hundreds of workers in the nest that do the majority of work foraging for food and resources. Since they are a swarm founding species even building new nests is mostly done by workers.

=== Reproductive suppression ===
Sometimes, there are intermediates in Polybia emaciata which are workers that used to be queens. It is likely that at the foundation of new nests they lost dominance competitions and lost their ability to produce eggs. Since they lost the dominance competition and there is limited space for the queens they lose their ability to reproduce.

=== Cooperation ===
For Polybia emaciata to survive and form new nests, a high amount of cooperation is required. This might explain why new nests are formed by new queens at the end of the reproductive period. During this time, the number of queens is low and the relatedness of the nest is high. So new queens will be able to found new nests with more closely related relatives. This ensures that at the new nests, there is likely to be many sister queens, all of which aids in cooperation.

=== Potential predator behavior ===
While Polybia emaciata are much less aggressive as a group than other species in their genus, they are natural predators and are capable of fighting. When faced with danger, they use signaling techniques like wing waving and leg raising to warn others of their capabilities.

== Kin selection ==
=== Genetic relatedness within colonies ===
In a colony with many queens, one might expect relatedness in the nest to be very low, but that is not the case in Polybia emaciata nest. Relatedness in these nests remains high due to cyclical oligogyny, which is a mating system in which new queens are only produced when the number of queens in the nest is low. As stated above, only when the number of queens is low will males be produced for the sake of reproduction and of the queens that remain there is generally a high level of relatedness, since they are usually the progeny of the same queen. Cyclical oligogyny also evolved independently in the African swarm-founding wasp Polybioides tabidus. Inbreeding has been shown to play no part in the relatedness of Polybia emaciata. While it would be a good explanation for such high relatedness, the data does not support inbreeding and instead supports cyclical oligarchy instead.

=== Reproductive dominance ===
There seems to be no evidence for reproductive dominance, especially since more than one queen may be able to reproduce. There is also no evidence to suggest that younger or older queens have an advantage when it comes to the number of eggs laid. To note, however, high levels of relatedness in the species would be more easily explained if dominance was present (the queen was laying more eggs) but that is not the case with Polybia emaciata.

== Interaction with other species ==
=== Diet ===
Polybia emaciata eats of steady fluid diet which includes nectar, but also eats other insects. It eats many species of flies and beetles. Diptera, Coleoptera, Hemiptera, Lepidoptera, Hymenoptera, Neuroptera, Orthoptera, Araneae, and Isopoda are all part of its diet.

=== Predators ===
Polybia emaciata have several vertebrate predators, and in some cases they are victim to nest parasite predation. Birds, bats, primates and army ants are among the most prevalent.

=== Defense ===
Polybia emaciata have a unique form of defense that stems from the very way they build their nest. Because their nest is made of mud which is much stronger than the leaf nests of other wasps in its species it is much more durable. In fact the build quality of the nests allows for the first line of defense used by Polybia emaciata to be doing nothing. They will not leave the nest and attack unless the nest is bothered for a long period of time. Other wasps in their genus will attack almost as soon as their nests are threatened but Polybia emaciata are much less willing to attack.
