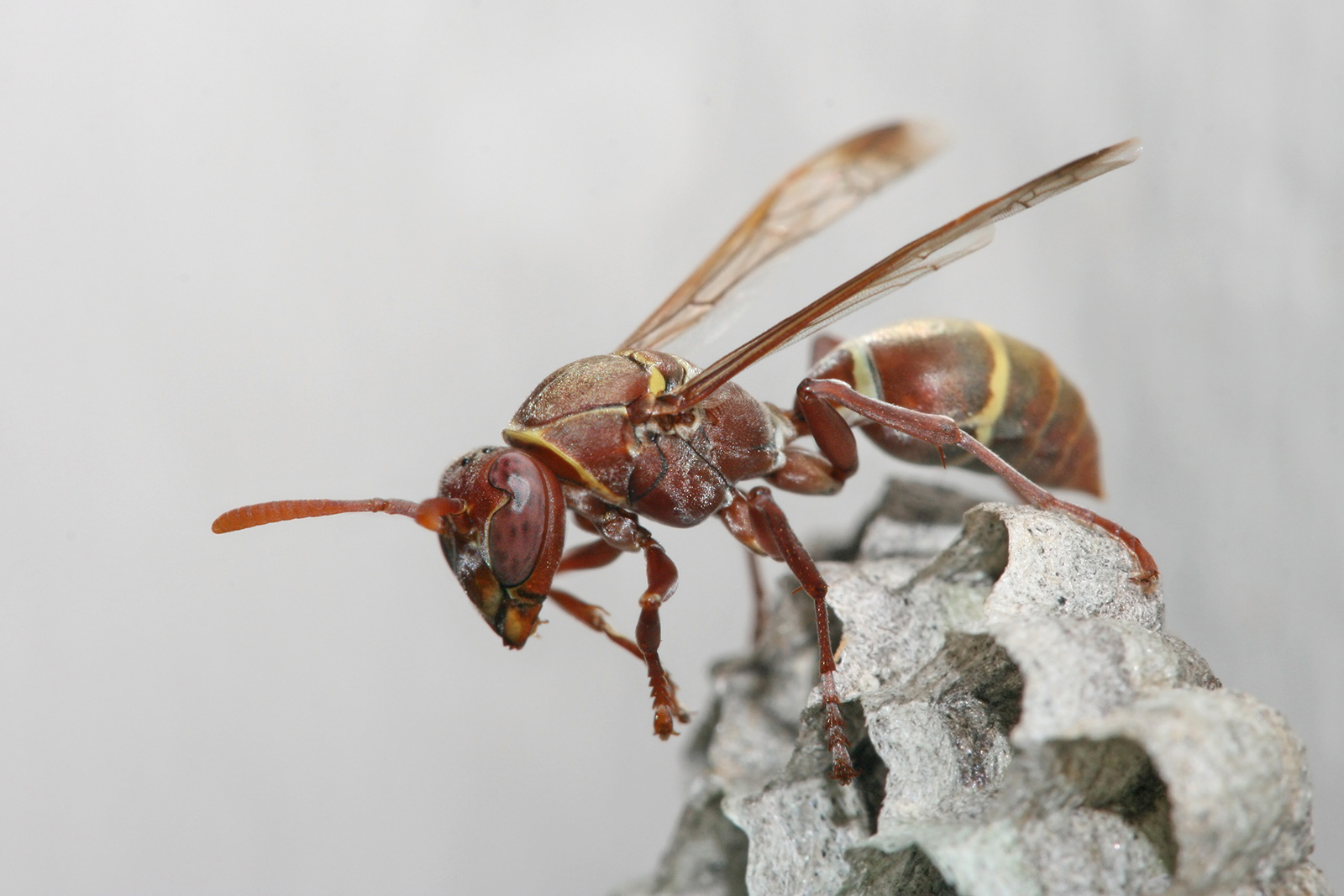
- Polistes africanus with nest

Scientific classification
- Kingdom: Animalia
- Phylum: Arthropoda
- Clade: Pancrustacea
- Class: Insecta
- Order: Hymenoptera
- Family: Vespidae
- Subfamily: Polistinae

Tribes
- Epiponini; Mischocyttarini; Polistini; Ropalidiini

= Polistinae =

Subfamily of insects

The Polistinae is a subfamily of eusocial wasps belonging to the family Vespidae. They are closely related to the yellowjackets and true hornets of the subfamily Vespinae and are divided into four tribes. With about 1,100 species total, it is the second-most diverse subfamily within the Vespidae, and while most species are tropical or subtropical, they include some of the most frequently encountered large wasps in temperate regions.

The English common name for Polistinae is paper wasp. Many polistines, such as Polistes fuscatus, Polistes annularis, and Polistes exclamans, make their nests out of paper. Despite being called paper wasps, other wasps (including the wasps in the subfamily Vespinae) also build nests out of paper. Additionally, epiponine wasps in the subgenus Polybia (Pedothoeca), such as Polybia emaciata, build their nests out of mud despite being Polistinae.

Polistes annularis suspends its paper nests from cliff overhangs via a pedicel, whose free fatty acids induce the necrophobic response in ants and causes them to avoid the pedicel rather than cross and prey on the nest's inhabitants. Polistes metricus foragers take off from their nests as if they already know how long their trip is. For short flights, they exit the nest flying horizontally, while for long flights they exit the nest flying straight up into a high altitude before pursuing their direction. Polistine brood cells are arranged in a hexagonal array, similar to the comb structure in a honey bee nest. Some species of the epiponine genera Polybia and Brachygastra store honey in the comb, among the few insects other than bees to store honey.

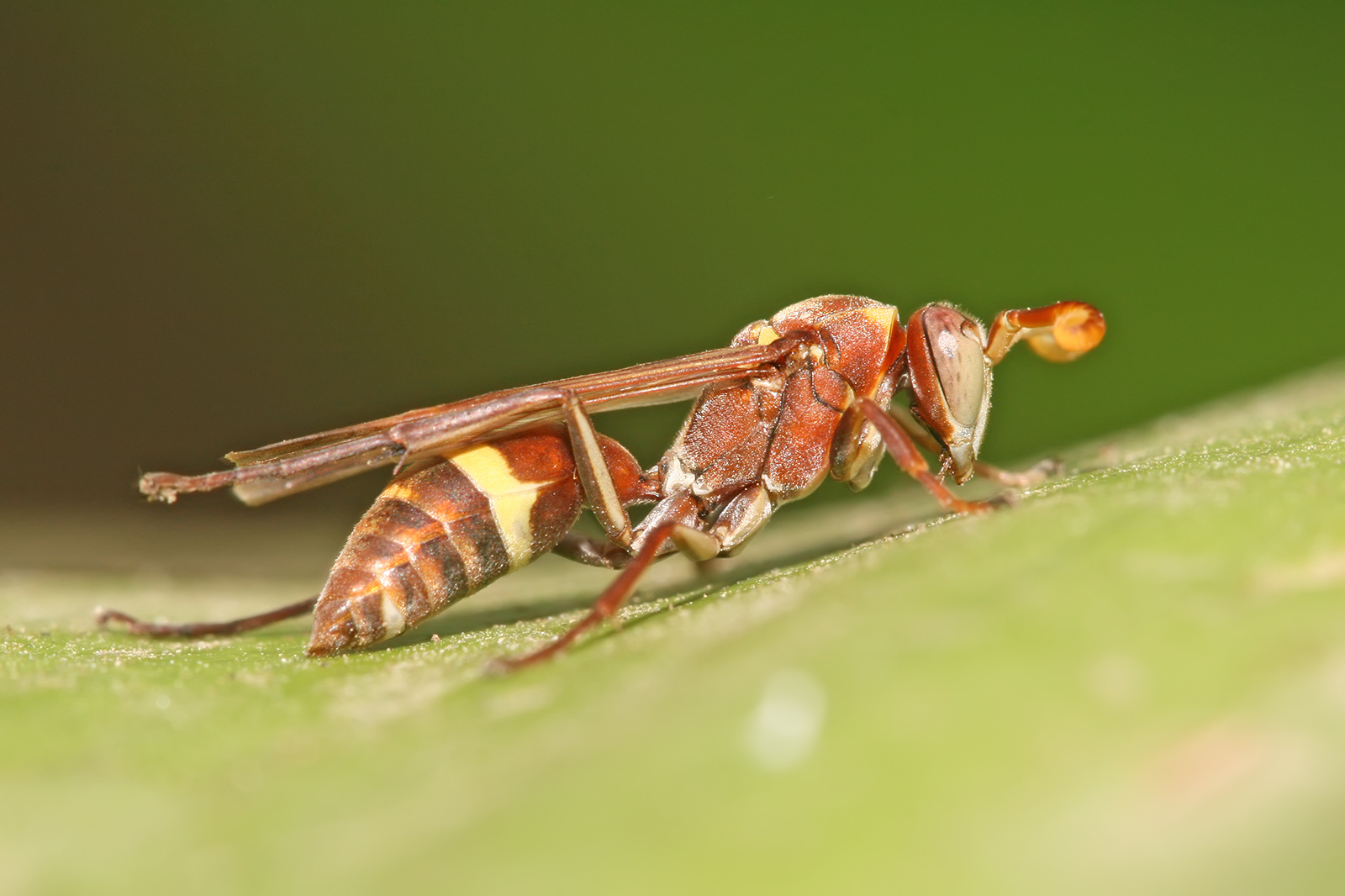
Polistes africanus

== Characteristics ==
Characteristics of the Polistinae are:

- The queens (reproductive females) are morphologically similar to workers, though sometimes slightly larger or differently colored.
- The abdomen is spindle-shaped, often petiolate.
- The antennae of males are curled.
- The nest is sometimes open (the nests of vespines are always enclosed in several layers of paper).

== Colony life cycle ==
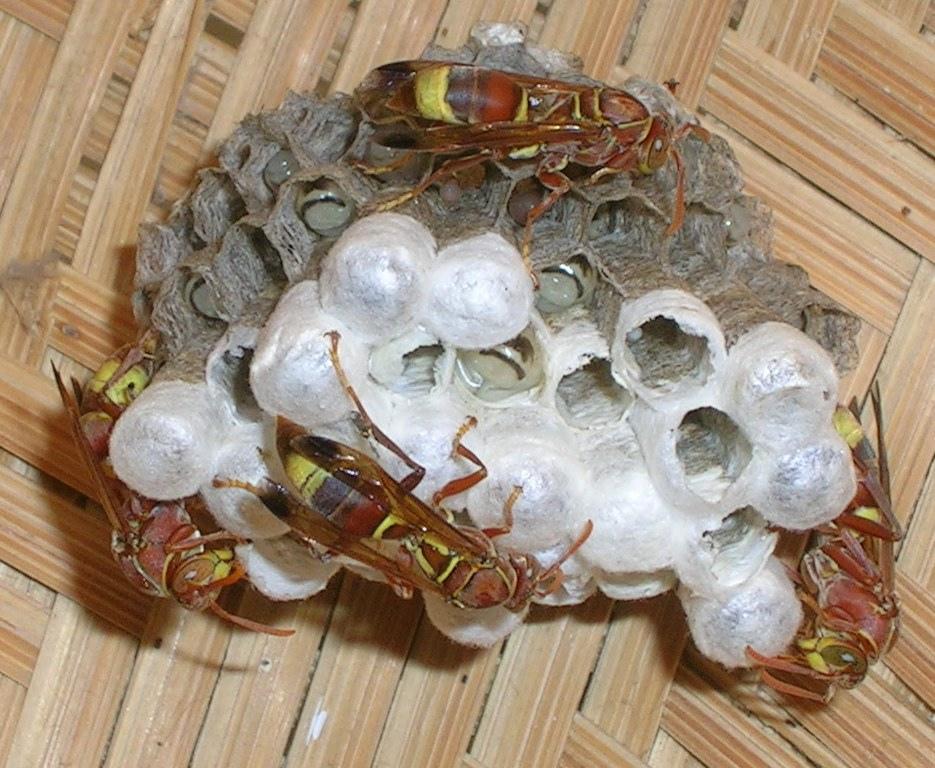
Nest of Polistes stigma tamulus

Polistine wasps found colonies in one of two ways. In some species, nests are founded by a small number of reproductive females, possibly a single one. One of the foundresses eventually acquires dominance over the other and is the sole reproducer. The nest is open (not enclosed by an envelope) and contains a single comb.

In the other group, called "swarm-founding", the nest is founded by a large number of workers and a few queens. It is usually protected by an envelope, like a vespine nest.

== Genera ==
=== Tribe Epiponini Lucas, 1867 ===
- Genus Agelaia Lepeletier, 1836
- Genus Angiopolybia Araujo, 1946
- Genus Apoica Lepeletier, 1836
- Genus Asteloeca Raw, 1985
- Genus Brachygastra Perty, 1833
- Genus Chartergellus Bequaert, 1938
- Genus Charterginus Fox, 1898
- Genus Chartergus Lepeletier, 1836
- Genus Clypearia de Saussure, 1854
- Genus Epipona Latreille, 1802
- Genus Leipomeles Möbius, 1856
- Genus Metapolybia Ducke, 1905
- Genus Nectarinella Bequaert, 1938
- Genus Parachartergus R. von Ihering, 1904
- Genus Polybia Lepeletier, 1836
- Genus Protonectarina Ducke, 1910
- Genus Protopolybia Ducke, 1905
- Genus Pseudopolybia de Saussure, 1863
- Genus Synoeca de Saussure, 1852

=== Tribe Mischocyttarini Carpenter, 1993 ===
- Genus Mischocyttarus Saussure, 1853

=== Tribe Polistini Lepeletier, 1836 ===
- Genus Polistes Latreille, 1802

=== Tribe Ropalidiini Bequaert, 1918 ===
- Genus Belonogaster de Saussure, 1854
- Genus Parapolybia de Saussure, 1854
- Genus Polybioides du Buysson, 1913
- Genus Ropalidia Guérin-Méneville, 1831
- †Genus Oligoropalidia Engel, Nguyen, & Nel, 2024

=== Tribe incertae sedis ===
- †Genus Palaeopolistes Perrard, 2014
- †Genus Palaeopolybia Antropov, 2014
- †Genus Protopolistes Antropov, 2014

== Gallery ==
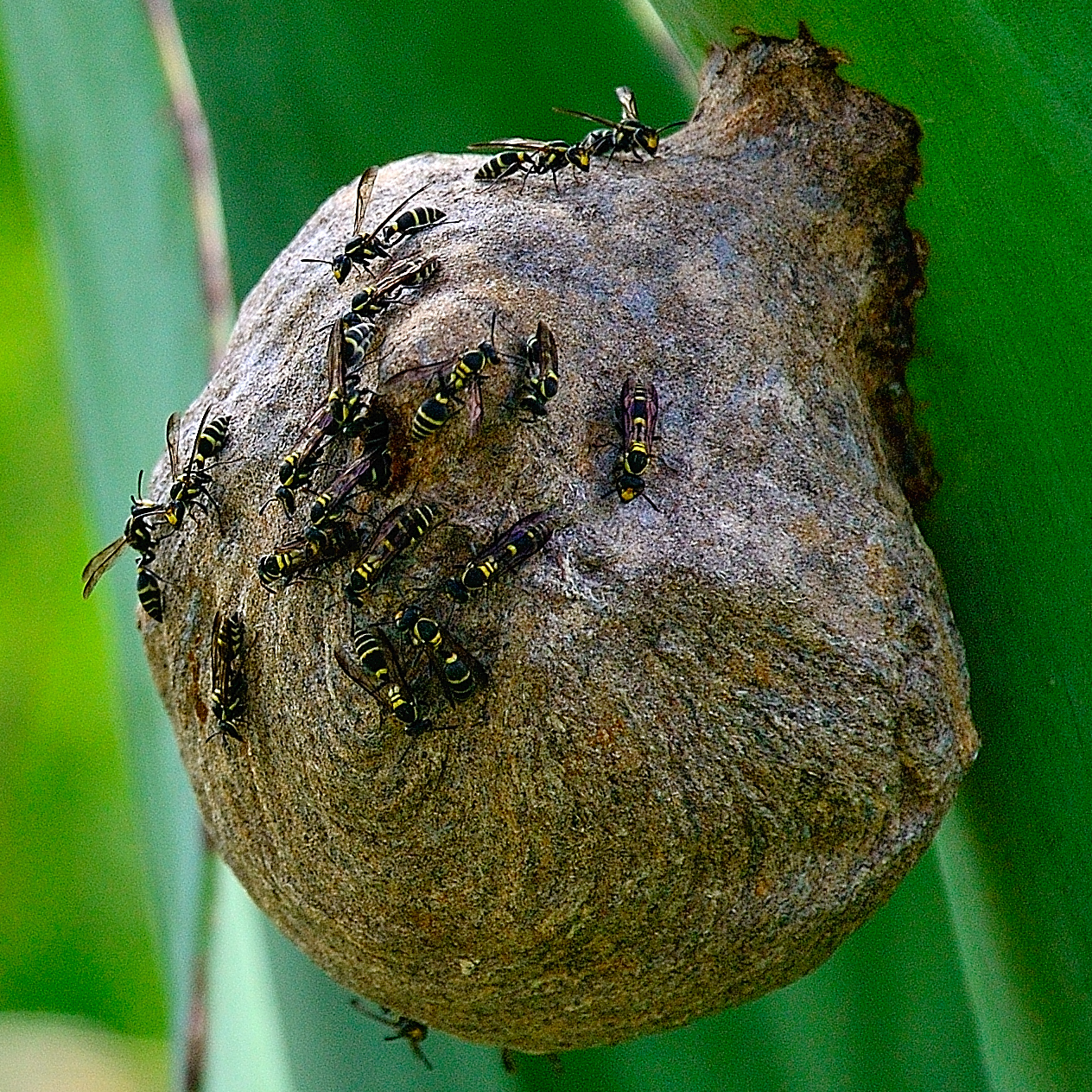
Nest of Polybia occidentalis honey-making wasps

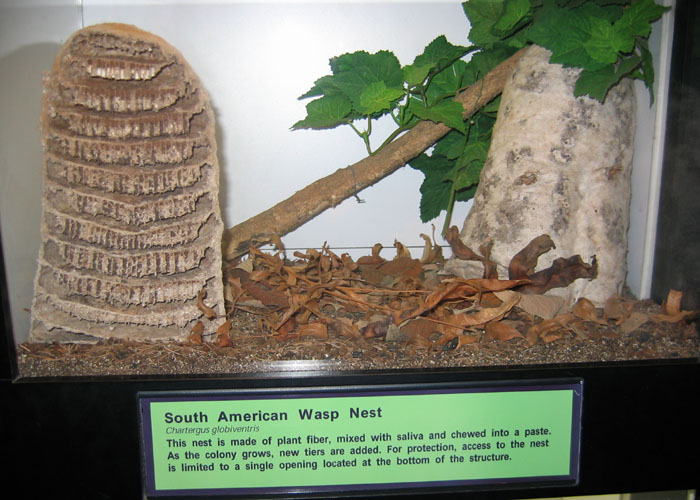
South American Chartergus globiventris nest
