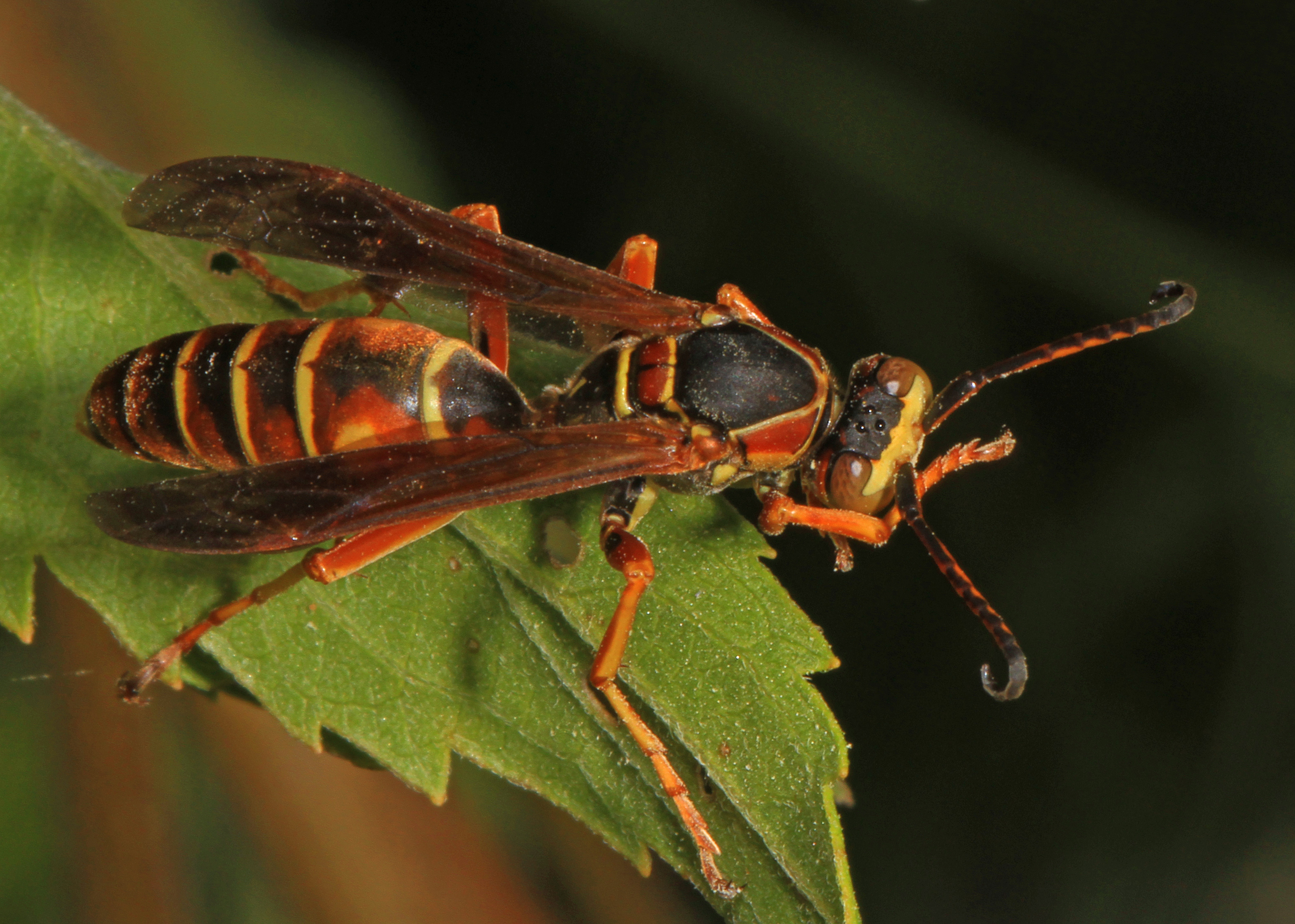
- In Virginia

Scientific classification
- Kingdom: Animalia
- Phylum: Arthropoda
- Clade: Pancrustacea
- Class: Insecta
- Order: Hymenoptera
- Family: Vespidae
- Subfamily: Polistinae
- Tribe: Polistini
- Genus: Polistes
- Species: P. fuscatus

Binomial name
- Polistes fuscatus (Fabricius, 1793)

Synonyms
- List: Polistes exilis Saussure, 1853; Polistes fortunatus Kirby 1884; Polistes laurentianus Bequard, 1942; Polistes pallidipes Lepeletier, 1836; Polistes pallipes Lepeletier, 1836; Polistes variatus Cresson, 1872; Vespa nestor Fabricius, 1798

= Polistes fuscatus =

Species of wasp

Polistes fuscatus, whose common name is the dark or northern paper wasp, is widely found in eastern North America, from southern Canada through the southern United States. It often nests around human development. However, it greatly prefers areas in which wood is readily available for use as nest material, therefore they are also found near and in woodlands and savannas. P. fuscatus is a social wasp that is part of a complex society based around a single dominant foundress along with other cofoundresses and a dominance hierarchy.

== Taxonomy and phylogeny ==
P. fuscatus is a part of the order Hymenoptera, the suborder Apocrita, the family of Vespidae, and the subfamily Polistinae, the second-largest subfamily within the Vespidae, of which all are social wasps. The Polistinae comprise four tribes, including Polistini, Epiponini, Mischocyttarini, and Ropalidiini. It is characterized by two major behaviors: colony founding and reproductive dominance. P. fuscatus is part of the Polistini tribe and in the genus Polistes. Polistes is one of the five independent-founding groups. Older taxonomic concepts considered P. fuscatus to have a much broader definition, treating several species, including P. apachus, P. aurifer, P. bellicosus, P. carolina, P. dorsalis, P. metricus, and P. rubiginosus, as varieties or subspecies of a single species. A study in which bootstrap analysis was conducted concluded that the narrower definition of P. fuscatus is part of the New World subgenus Fuscopolistes. In addition to P. fuscatus, Fuscopolistes includes separate species concepts for P. bellicosus, P. apachus, P. aurifer, P. carolina, P. dorsalis, and P. metricus, all of which are the closest relatives of P. fuscatus.

== Description ==
The length of P. fuscatus often ranges between 15 and 21 mm (0.59 and 0.83 in). The fore wing length ranges between 11.5 and 17.0 mm (0.45 and 0.67 in); in general, the fore wing of males is above 13.0 mm (0.51 in), whereas females have a fore wing length above 11.0 mm (0.43 in). Both males and females have rather slender bodies and have a waist that connects the thorax to the abdomen. The female has a venomous sting. The pain of its sting is commonly compared to being pricked with a large needle, such of that of a tattoo. Like coloration (below), length can also vary by season of emergence.

The physical characteristics of the P. fuscatus are highly dependent on the geographic location of its habitat. Throughout the United States, three color pattern trends represent different regions throughout the country. The male is identified by its darkened apical flagellomeres in addition to its darkened dorsal surface of the apical flagellomeres that is common to other species of wasps. Northern females on the other hand are easily identified by the blackening of their entire bodies which may or may not have markings of other colors. Many southern P. fuscatus individuals, however, have additional markings and may resemble wasps of other species.

The facial and abdominal markings of P. fuscatus are highly variable, including a variety of different patterns, such as small dots, long stripes, clypeus blotches, yellow abdominal dots, upper clypeus stripes, and combinations of both clypeus edge and tip colorations. Furthermore, some wasps have these facial and abdominal patterns in brown and black instead of yellow. These marking colors, however, are often influenced by the geographic location of the wasp.

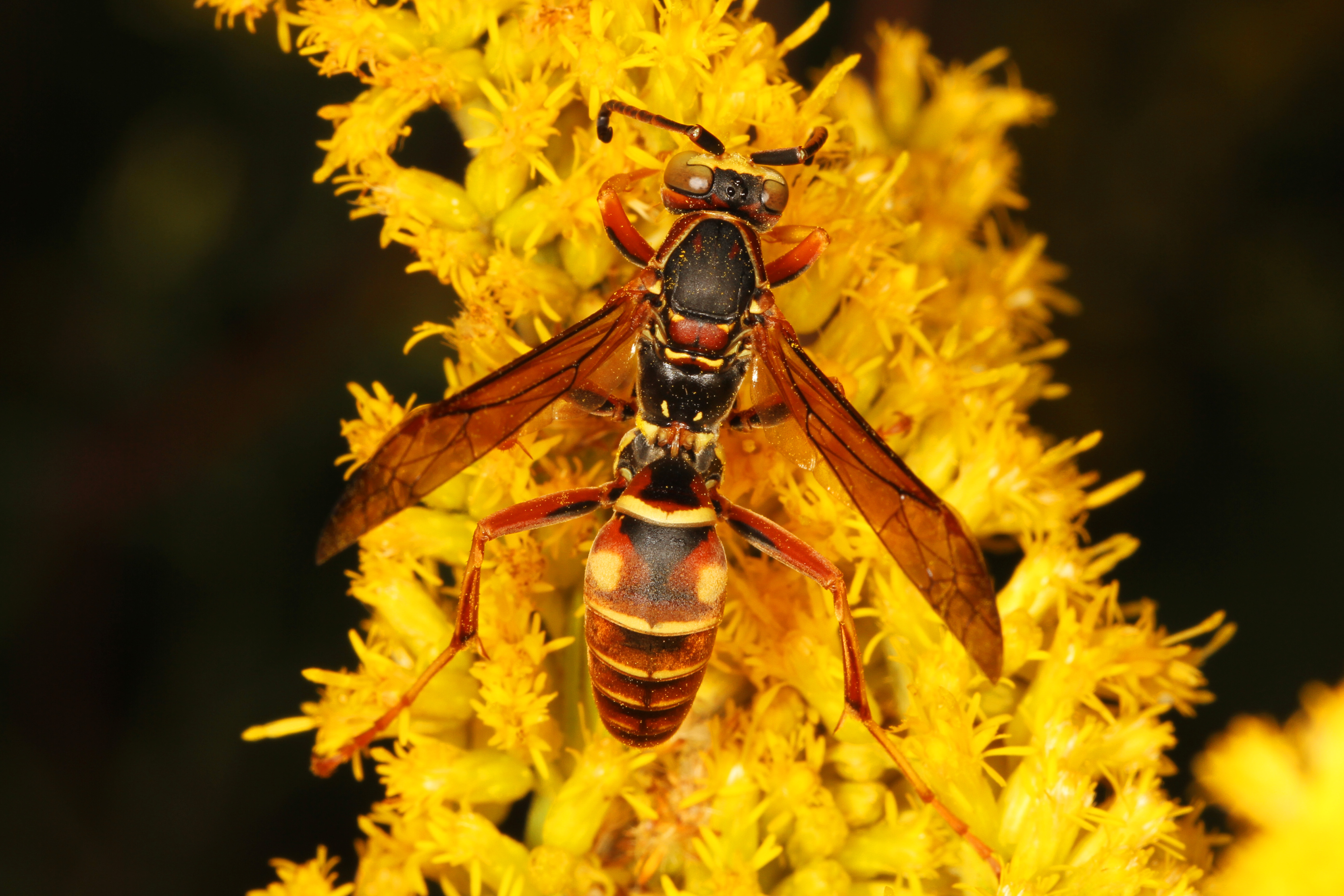
P. fuscatus from Virginia with brilliant red and yellow concentric abdominal spots

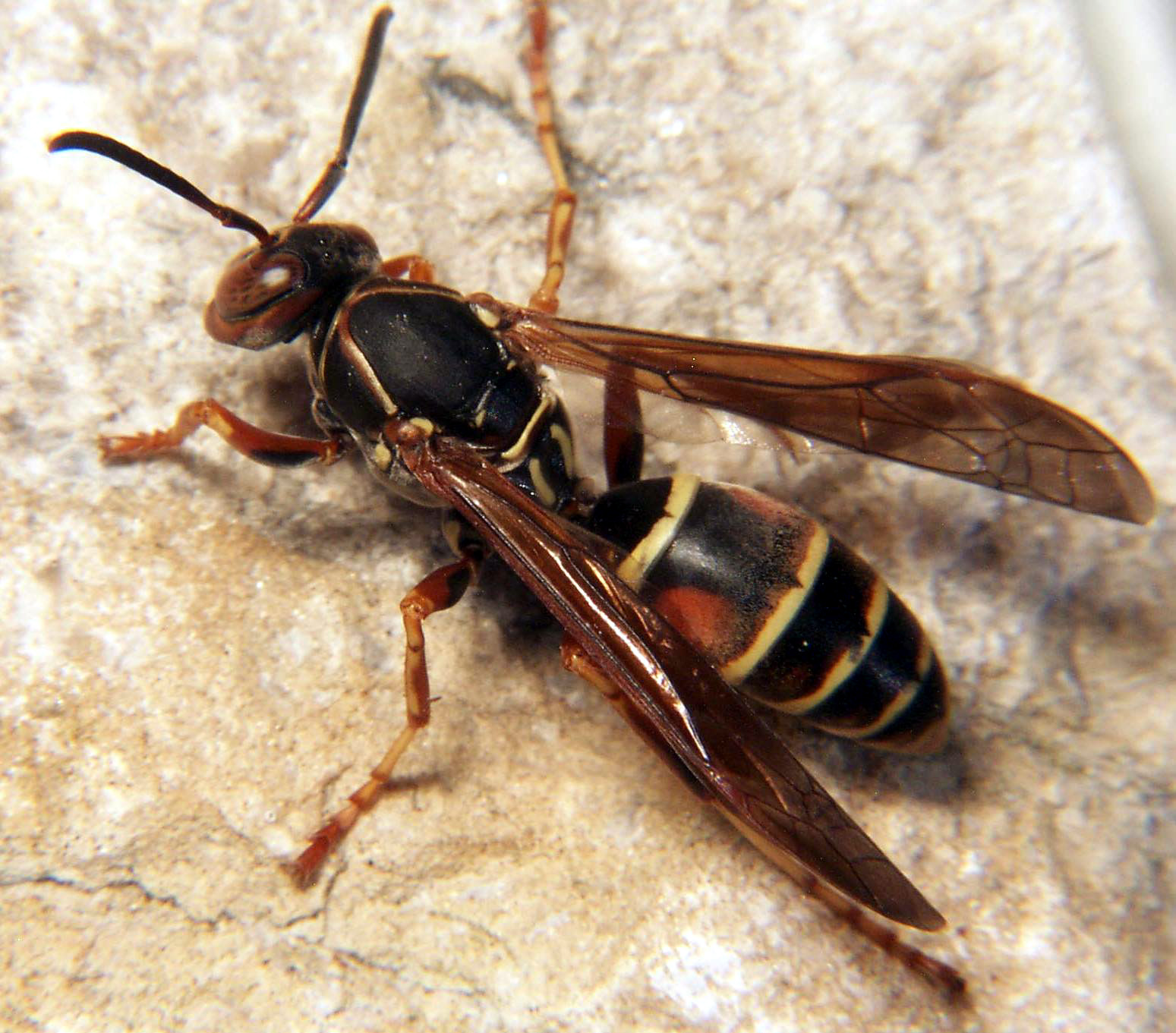
P. fuscatus from Illinois with a striped abdomen and red abdominal spots

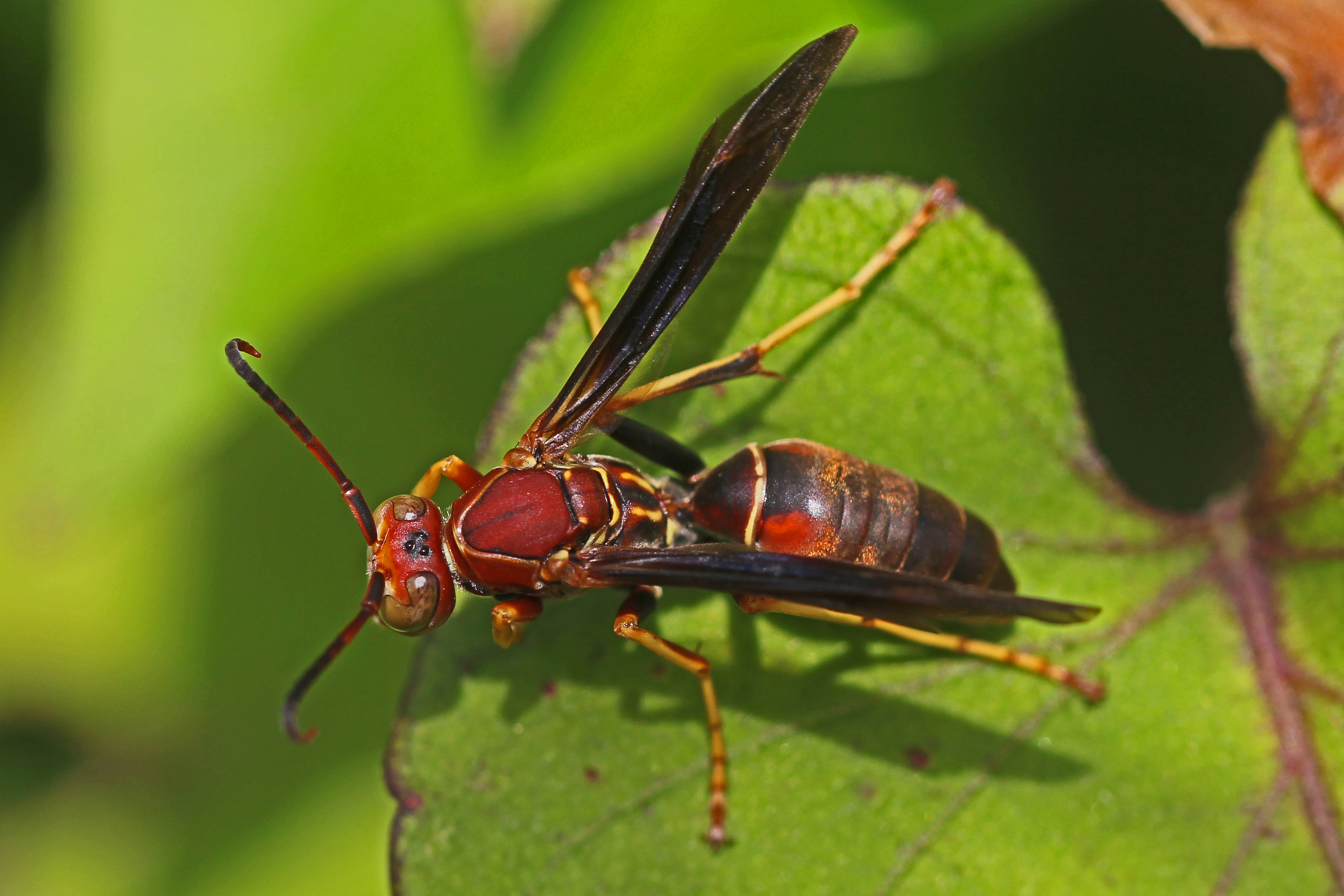
P. fuscatus from Florida with a black solid abdomen and red spots

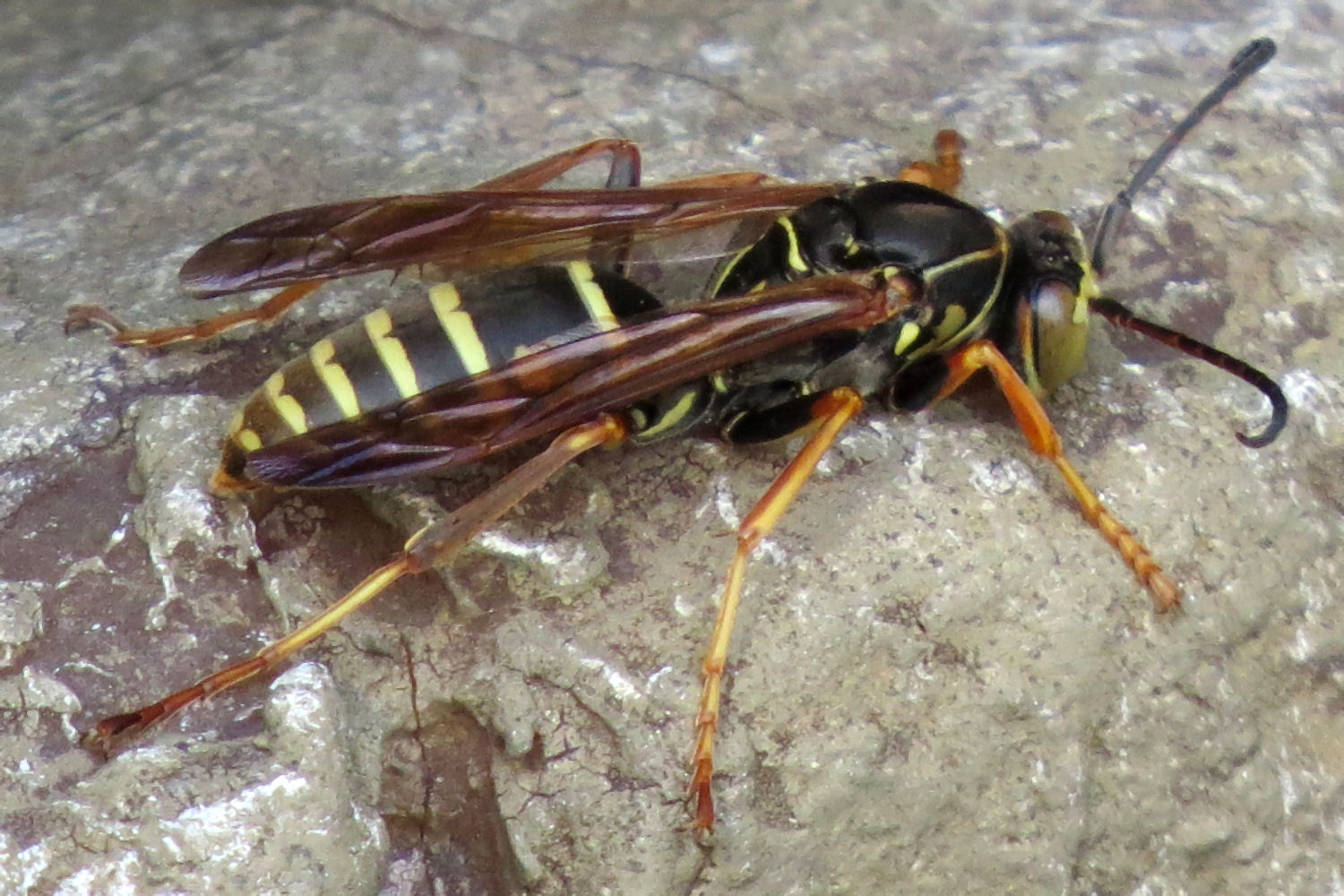
P. fuscatus from Quebec with yellow abdominal spots and stripes and no red markings

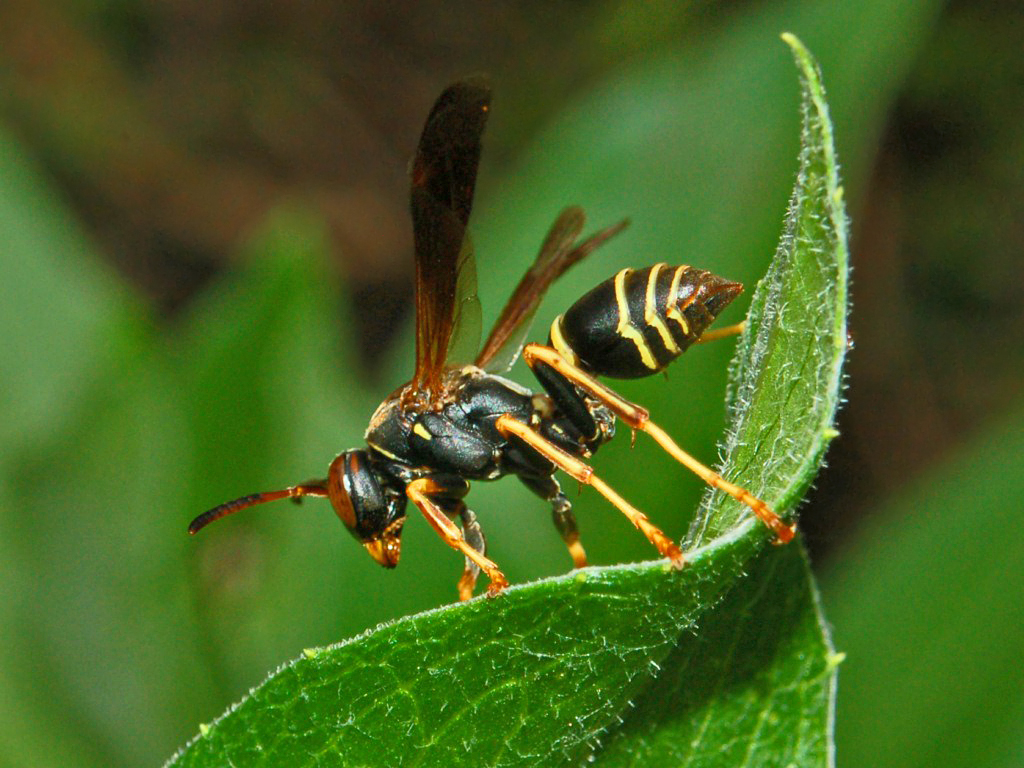
P. fuscatus from Quebec with yellow abdominal stripes, lacking both spots and red markings

== Distribution and habitat ==
Polistes fuscatus's distribution along the eastern half of North America ranges from southern Canada to the United States. It reaches as far south as Texas and Florida. Although P. fuscatus prefers wooded areas for the readily available resources to build the nest, it also is often seen in areas which humans inhabit. Nests are produced using wood provided from their habitat, masticated with fluid produced by its mouth to create a pulp-like substance. However, a recently mutated form of the wasp has developed an attraction to colder lamps, such as fluorescent lamps, and they commonly use areas surrounding them as a habitat to lay their eggs.

Another eusocial wasp species, Polistes dominula, has been recognized as a threat to P. fuscatus. P. dominula has been displacing P. fuscatus at many of the formerly P. fuscatus-dominated areas. P. dominula was likely replacing P. fuscatus through indirect or exploitative competition, which was consistent with the finding that P. dominula was significantly more productive than P. fuscatus.

== Lifecycle ==
The lifecycle lasts about one year. In early spring, the new foundress emerging from diapause starts a new colony, building an umbrella-shaped nest made of a papery material and suspended from a single stalk. The foundress lays eggs into individual cells. The first generation is composed of infertile female workers. In the next generation, multiple foundresses are hatched with communal nests, but the other fertile females accept the dominance of a single female and raise offspring cooperatively. Later in summer, the next year's foundresses are produced, and they mate with males. The newly mated foundresses hibernate in winter, while old founding foundresses, workers (sterile females), and males die.

== Colony cycle ==
Colony stages can be separated into three stages based on nest content: pre-emergence (nest initiation to first adult), emergence-enlargement (emergence of first adult to beginning brood decline), and post-enlargement (no further new cell addition). The total number of wasps in the colony can be well over 200.

Prior to nest initiation, females come together post hibernation in clusters before separating and starting their own colonies in early spring. During this time, the wasps are particularly aggressive when other wasps encroach on their territory; this aggression may be associated with the development of their ovaries. Colony founding can be either independent or swarm founding. Independent founding consists of the founding of small, simple nests that are constructed without a paper envelope by a single or few foundresses with one or several inseminated egg-layers and no workers. Swarm founding includes the construction of large swarms and are founded by multiple foundresses with many workers. Nests are normally initiated by a single foundress during early May; however, if another foundress joins, the nest may be founded by several foundresses. In the early beginning of the founding of the nest, females exhibit much aggression in order to assert dominance to determine the hierarchical ranking; dominant females will exhibit oophagy and become foundresses.

In the beginning of the pre-emergence stage, there are very few eggs in the nest. The mean of the pre-emergence stage is about 48 days long; it includes the egg, larval, and pupal stages and may also be affected by nutrition and temperature. The first eggs that are laid are all female workers that can care for future reproductive females. After the first eggs are laid, both male and female eggs are laid until mid-September; the laying of male eggs has been shown to be correlated with increased oviposition rate of the dominant females. After the hatching of both male and female eggs, only female adults emerge, though eggs laid after the end of July no longer emerge and reach adulthood. The foundress disappears at the end of July, which is when both the number of laid eggs and the rate at which the nest grows decline, though other reproductive females may continue to lay eggs. The brood itself begins to decline towards late August, thus leading to the conclusion that brood declination occurs when reproduction no longer occurs. After reaching the post-enlargement behavior, brood destruction occurs in which wasps begin exhibiting abortive behavior by either throwing larva out or feeding them to existing nest mates; if not aborted, these larvae eventually emerge as abnormal adults. After this destruction, the adult wasps abandon the nests. Prior to hibernation, the wasps cluster together in aggregations to mate and then begin hibernation until the next season.

== Behavior ==
Polistes fuscatus is an eusocial organism that has a hierarchical social system usually centered around one foundress. Although this species is classified as eusocial, its social organization is not as evolved as other eusocial organisms. Foundress-initiated interactions can be placed into two broad categories: solicitations and non-solicitations. Solicitations include “receipt of water, nectar, pulp, or prey from returned foragers,” while non-solicitations include, “antennation, lunging/bumping, chasing, grappling, and biting”. Foundresses spend substantially less time off the nest compared to workers. Workers vary significantly in time spent off the nest, which correlates with foraging efforts. More dominant workers spend less time off the nest compared with less dominant workers. Other eusocial insects, such as soldier termites, have developed guard polymorphs that specialize in nest defense. Paper wasps on the other hand, have only workers and foundresses who defend the nest together. The foundress is the most aggressive defender of the nest since she has the most reproductive investment. In some cases, Polistes fuscatus has been shown to share nests with a closely related species, Polistes metricus.

=== Dominance ===
Polistes fuscatus has a linear dominance hierarchy that revolves around the fertility of each individual wasp; those that are more dominant within the nest generally have the larger or more developed ovaries. The hierarchy is first formed in the pre-emergence period between foundresses in which they fight aggressively to establish dominance until the hierarchy is established, and only later formed among the workers of the colony such that they are integrated into the hierarchy. When the foundress is removed, the second highest ranking female then takes the foundress place in being the primary egg layer.

The posture of wasps is very telling of which is dominant or subordinate. The dominant wasp generally sits higher than the subordinate, whereas the subordinates have a lower stance. For wasps of equal rank, it is not uncommon for them to continuously try to rise higher and begin to aggressively fight each other until they fall due to losing their foothold. This is often called the falling fight, though it is more common for one wasp to act as a subordinate.

Dominance ranking may also affect the location females may be at within the nest and how far away wasps are spaced. In P. fuscatus, those who are higher on the dominance ranking make continuous darts at other lower-ranking wasps such that other wasps will not closely sit near the higher ranking wasp.

=== Nest recognition ===
Members of a colony are able to recognize non-resident wasps by how they approach the nest and by their dominance behavior. Members of the colony approach the nest in a swift and purposeful fashion, whereas wasps that are not part of the colony hover by the nest and do not exhibit a specific direction. Oftentimes, they hover by the nest without landing. If spotted, members of the colony begin to act aggressively and alarm others of the possible intruder. Non-resident wasps are often chased out of the nest within the first five minutes of entering.

On occasion, however, resident wasps may mistake other resident wasps as non-resident wasps. This occurs when the mistaken wasp has just come back from foraging and is too full to obtain the velocity necessary to fly towards the nest as if it were a resident of the nest. Sometimes, to obtain the speed necessary, the wasp attempts to approach the nest several times. Dominance relations also allow for members to recognize nest mates as each wasp is of a particular rank; when a non-resident arrives and has no dominance rank, it is conceived as being unfamiliar. Wasps that are not part of the colony are only accepted without aggression when a dominance hierarchy or conflict has not occurred.

=== Individual recognition ===
Individual recognition is highly important in the formation of behavioral interactions between members of different castes within a nest of P. fuscatus. The ability to recognize individuals is vital for the existence of a linear dominance hierarchy, which facilitates reproductive suppression and division of labor. Critically, the ability to recognize individuals also helps dictate how one wasp may treat another, whether it be to hold a dominant role or to act submissively within an interaction.

Polistes fuscatus can recognize individual nest-mates through specific facial and abdominal markings. One study indicated that if the facial and abdominal markings of a wasp were modified with acrylic paints, reintroduction of the modified individual would cause it to receive increased aggression until it was reintegrated back into the colony (i.e. when the nest-mates felt familiar with that wasp). The study was able to indicate that recognition was specific to the individual given that there was no relationship between specific markings and dominance rank, rather markings were purely used for individual recognition.

The ability to recognize individuals may be used to reduce aggressive interaction between individuals of different dominance ranks, as well as to help foundresses determine and regulate the amount of resources each individual within the nest receives. One mechanism for this reduced aggression occurs where colony members engage in social eavesdropping, where they observe the result of a dominance bout and infer their relative position in the hierarchy without engaging in a fight directly.

Researchers found that when Polistes fuscatus paper wasps live isolated, their anterior optic tubercle, the area responsible for processing visual colors, grows more relative to mushroom body. Moreover, they lose the ability to recognize other paper wasps' colored faces.

=== Colony defense ===
A greater part in the division of labor in colony defense is given to the foundress of the colony. Foundresses come into contact and interact with non-resident wasps and returning nest-mates more often compared to other resident wasps and come into contact with wasp intruders at a much higher rate. Although this finding could be attributed to the foundress's location preference of being at the face of the nest, it was found that even normalizing for the preferred location, foundresses still encountered non-nest mates at a higher rate than expected. In addition, foundress wasps are much less tolerant of non-resident and returning nest mates compared to non-foundress nest mates; however, both the foundress and the colony members become less tolerant of non-resident wasps later on during the colony cycle.

Foundresses may be less tolerant of intruders compared to other colony members due to the consequences of accepting non-nest mates into the colony. Often, female intruders that join the colony attempt to evict the previous foundress and usurp the position. Whereas this result is harmful for the foundress, other members of the nest are not negatively impacted; they would simply remain in the nest and serve the new foundress. Therefore, much of the defense of the colony is left up to the foundress.

=== Colony defense against vertebrate predators ===
Polistes fuscatus invests much in the nests. Nests provide locations that members of the colony can return to and act as a central location that can allow for more efficient work in reproduction and foraging behavior. Although nests can provide many benefits, it also has the disadvantage of concentrating all investment in one area; this concentration allows for vertebrate predators to have the ability to destroy an entire nest and therefore destroy all investment. Vertebrate predators of P. fuscatus include foxes, rodents, and birds. Judd's study on the defensive behavior of colonies of the paper wasp indicated that the behavior of wasps was highly dependent on reproductive investment. Prior to the emergence of many adult wasps, the wasps acted much more aggressively; however, when the nest no longer contained any brood and, therefore, not much investment, the wasps were much more likely to flee rather than act aggressively against the vertebrate predator.

=== Foraging behavior ===
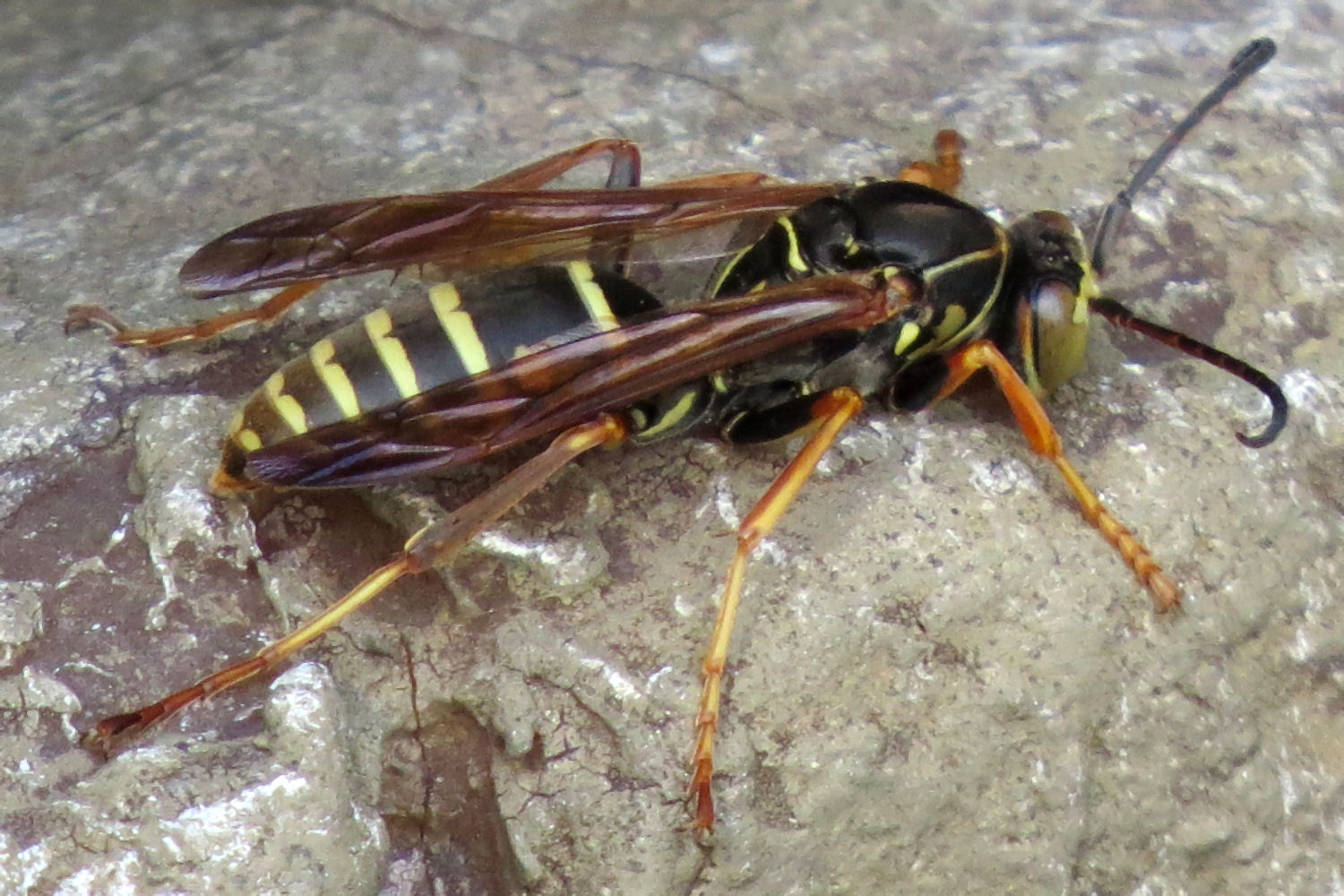
Foraging for fibres

Edwards indicated in his work that social wasps, “collect water, plant fibers, and carbohydrates, and hunt arthropod prey or scavenge animal proteins.” Water is used for the following processes: nest cooling, construction, and metabolism; plant fibers are used for construction, and carbohydrates and protein is used as food and energy. Water is a vital resource for wasps given its many capabilities, and many wasps will go to a variety of places to obtain it, such as puddles and ponds, or even drinking fountains and faucets. Wasps are able to obtain water by imbibing it and regurgitating it once they return to the nest and are able to use it for construction by mixing it with the masticated plant fibers. These plant fibers are collected from dead wood. By mixing the plant fibers with water, wasps are able to create pulp which is then used to help the construction of nests.

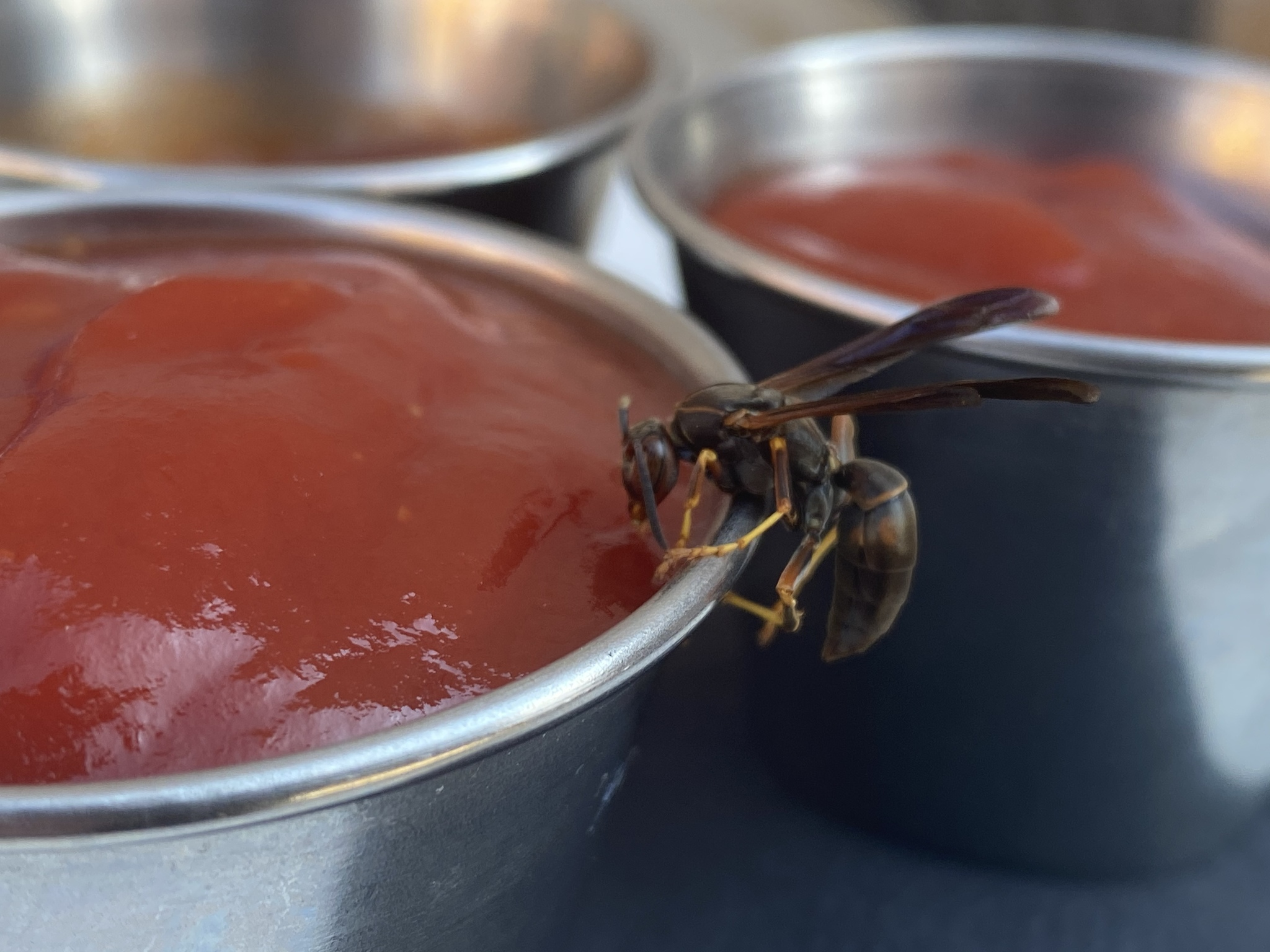
Eating ketchup, in Pennsylvania

Polistes fuscatus is considered to be a generalist prey forager, but may also act as a specialist due to its habit of commonly returning to a specific location or to prey on the same species. They use the scavenged animal protein from both vertebrates and arthropods such as: caterpillars, flies, alate ants, termites, spiders, bees, and other wasps to help the development of their brood. Social wasps collect carbohydrates from nectar, sap, and fruits and may store them within the nest; some wasps may even steal or consume carbohydrates from other carbohydrate foraging or making arthropods. Although the foraging of social wasps is not as developed as some other arthropod species given its weakness in recruitment, the ability to communicate to nest mates of the location of a resource stronghold, it may impact the greater ecosystem.

=== Diet ===
Polistes fuscatus eats arthropod prey, animal proteins, carbohydrates and protein. They will eat caterpillars, flies, ants, termites, spiders, bees, and other wasps. Carbohydrates may include nectar, sap, and fruits.

=== Differential egg eating ===
Egg laying by subordinate females and the oophagy of these eggs by dominant female wasps will occur until two weeks after the first female eggs emerge. Prior to these two weeks, egg layers will continuously eat other female wasps’ eggs approximately eleven minutes post being laid; however, no egg layers would ever eat their own eggs, indicating that they could recognize their own individual eggs. It can be conjectured that subordinate egg layers could not lay eggs as quickly as dominant egg layers given the dominant egg layers’ greater supply of ova from the subordinate egg layers indicating that oophagy and oviposition occur close together. Previous studies have also shown that subordinate egg layers may no longer lay eggs after associating with the higher-ranking females after a certain period; this is probably due to the necessity of expending energy during foraging and inability to invest as much into their own eggs.

== Sexual behavior ==
=== Mating ===
Prior to hibernation, males and females will undergo mating; they will aggregate together in sunlit areas that are relatively higher in location. Males will sit out waiting to pursue females in order to mate. Once a female is spotted, unlike the usual passive male within the nest, the sexually responsive male will attempt to mount the female and begin performing abdominal stroking. Females will react aggressively in order to struggle free. If the female were to elude the male's hold, the male wasp would return to its position to attempt to copulate again. While copulating, the male exhibits several movements, such as abdominal stroking, extrusion of genitals, grasping the female abdomen, rhythmic antennal vibrations, and grasping of the female antennae. Antennas and antennal movement are important for copulation. Some studies have indicated that females without antenna and females who do not depress their antennae cannot copulate. It has also been proposed that antennal movements help copulation through assisting the attachment of genitals. In addition, research by Post and Jeanne has shown that Polistes fuscatus females have no preference on mating with related or unrelated males.

=== Reproduction ===
The mating season for Polistes fuscatus is during the spring and summer, after the nest has been abandoned. Venom is released by females that contains a sex pheromone that induces copulatory behavior in males. The continual release of the venom causes males to try to copulate with females when they are unreceptive on the nest, thus interrupting the activities of the colony. After mating has occurred, the foundress will lay an initial generation of infertile female workers. Later on in the life of the nest, male and fertile female offspring are produced.

The eggs capable of becoming foundresses are laid during the summer. Laying these eggs during the summer ensures that the larvae are well-fed due to the great environmental conditions and abundance of food. These eggs hatch before fall and the resulting offspring hibernate during fall and winter. The new foundresses or co-foundresses emerge in the spring to begin new nests and lay eggs. After laying eggs that will later develop into new foundresses, the old foundresses die along with all accompanying workers and males. As opposed to other eusocial insects such as vespid wasps, Polistes fuscatus have not been found to preferentially mate with their siblings or have sibling recognition mechanisms to aid in kin selection during reproduction. This is surprising since there are many advantages of inbreeding for haplodiploid organisms.

=== Sex allocation ===
According to Fisher's theory of sex ratio selection, when competition for mates is population wide, parents will evolve to invest equally in both sexes. However, in eusocial hierarchies, there is often conflict between the workers and the foundress to promote their genes within the colony. The foundress favors a 1:1 sex ratio, but the workers favor female progeny because they share approximately 75% (r=0.75) of their genes with their sisters, provided that the foundress only mated once. In Polistes fuscatus, the sex ratio is usually 1:1 for several reasons. First, males generally leave the nest to scout for mates soon after they reach adulthood, promoting population competition for mates. Second, the number of workers within a colony is relatively small (generally less than 40) making it less likely for a worker to confront the foundress. Also, since colonies are annual and workers are reared by the foundress's subordinate foundresses, the foundress can manipulate how much food they receive as larvae. Polistes fuscatus foundresses likely mate with multiple males so that the relatedness of workers is less than if they all shared the same father's genes. Finally, in the second generation of the foundresses offspring, males are usually reared earlier than reproductive females. Thus when the workers have the opportunity to bias the sex ratio, there are few male larvae present. Additionally, the males have usually completed part of their development, giving them a higher reproductive value than new eggs. Thus the costs of destroying male larvae or replacing the male larvae with their own eggs is not worth the investment.
