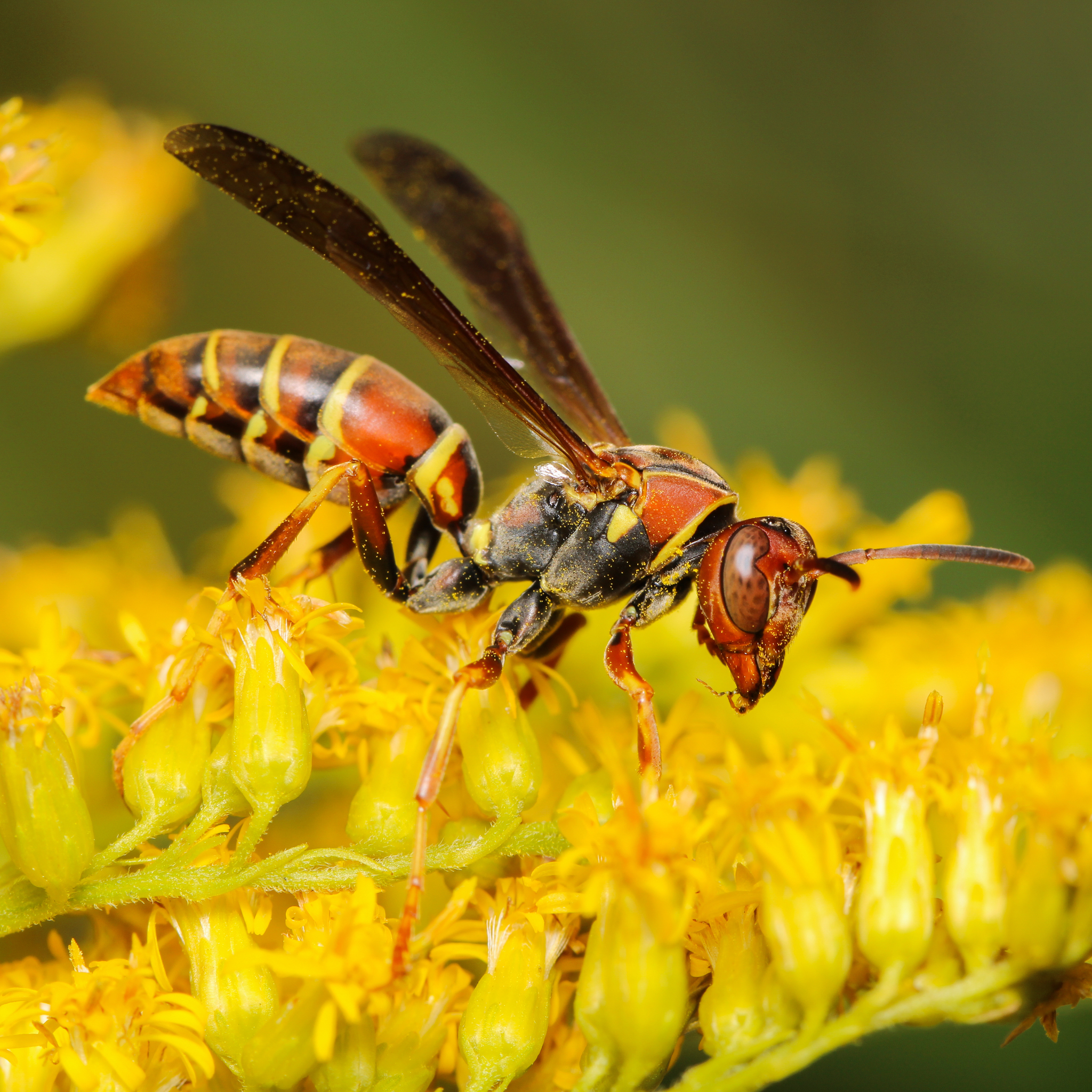

Conservation status
- Data Deficient (IUCN 3.1)

Scientific classification
- Kingdom: Animalia
- Phylum: Arthropoda
- Class: Insecta
- Order: Hymenoptera
- Family: Vespidae
- Subfamily: Polistinae
- Tribe: Polistini
- Genus: Polistes
- Species: P. dorsalis

Binomial name
- Polistes dorsalis (Fabricius, 1775)
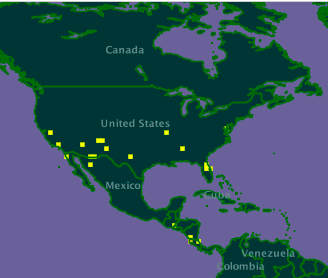
- Distribution of P. dorsalis in yellow

Synonyms
- Vespa dorsalis Fabricius, 1775; Polistes fuscatus hunteri Bequeart, 1940; Polistes hunteri Bequeart, 1940

= Polistes dorsalis =

Species of wasp

Polistes dorsalis is a species of social wasps that can be found throughout various parts of North America. It is classified under the Vespidae within the genus of Polistes. Male Polistes dorsalis wasps can be distinguished from other Polistes species by their distinctly prominent median tubercle of sternum 7. Both sexes can also be recognized due to their v- shaped yellow markings on their head. They are distributed widely across North America and can be found in sheltered nests, typically closer to the ground. These wasps live in a dominance hierarchy in which the queen's role differs from that of ordinary workers. When threatened, these wasps can deliver moderately painful stings. Their venom might also be of human interest for their antimicrobial uses.

== Taxonomy and phylogeny ==
A member of the Vespidae family, Polistes dorsalis is classified within Polistinae, one of the largest subfamilies consisting of a diverse group of social wasps. Under this subfamily, there are two behavioral groups that differ in their methods of colony formation and the presence of reproductive dominance. The first of these groups form colonies through swarming, as multiple foundresses initiate a nest. On the contrary, Polistes wasps are independent, and a nest is constructed by an individual or by a select number of female wasps. Polistes dorsalis are related to P. fuscatus, P. metrics, and P. carolina. P. dorsalis was formerly known as P. hunteri.

There are five subspecies described:

- Polistes dorsalis californicus Bohart, 1949
- Polistes dorsalis clarionensis Bohart, 1949
- Polistes dorsalis dorsalis (Fabricius, 1775)
- Polistes dorsalis maritimus Bequaert, 1940
- Polistes dorsalis neotropicus Bequaert, 1940

== Description and identification ==
Polistes dorsalis is one of the smaller species of Polistes wasps. Wasps can have two sets of wings: fore and hind wings. This species of wasp tend to have a fore wing length of around 11–17 mm. The exoskeletal plate is in the shape of a shield and located below its frons, usually black or dark brown in color with a band of yellow. Its sides are also mainly black in color with distinct yellow markings. The elongated segments of its antenna, or flagellomeres that stem from the base, tend to be less tapered and dull orange in color. The abdomen of female Polistes dorsalis can be composed of alternating dull orange, yellow, brown, and black sections. Female Polistes dorsalis have colorings similar to that of P. fuscatus, P. apachus, and P. bellicosus, but can be distinguished from both by looking at femoral markings and differences in the coloring. P. dorsalis tend to be more black and brown in coloring that forms a ring around the femora.

== Distribution and habitat ==
Polistes dorsalis are common to the southeastern region of the United States, as it has been recorded in various states like MA, NY, and FL. This species of wasp are also found to reside throughout North and Central America, for example off the coast of the Bahamas. There have also been groups reported off the coasts of Mexico.

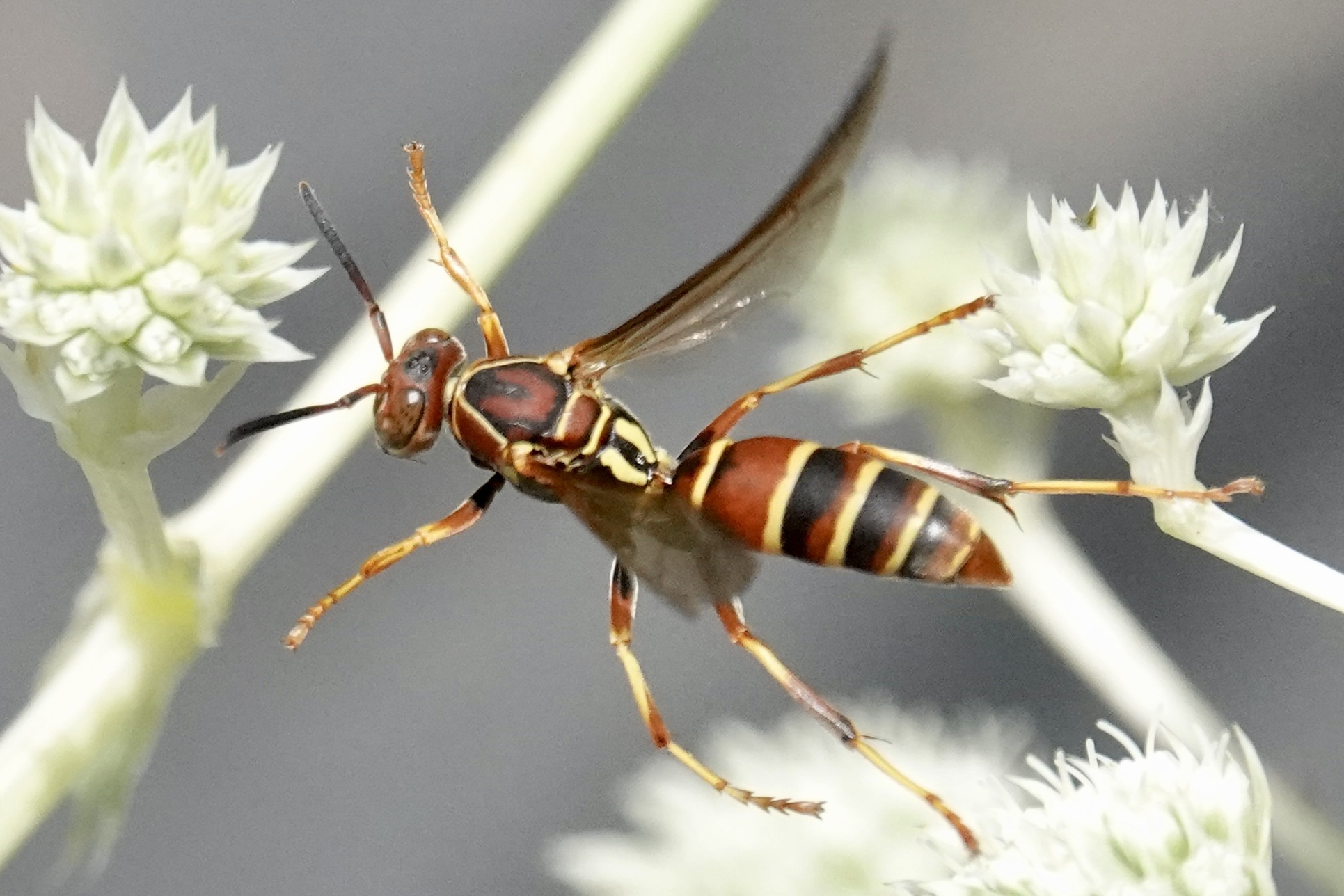
Polistes dorsalis dorsalis, Hanover County, VA, USA, 2022

It is characteristic for their nests to be constructed in areas that are highly sheltered and inconspicuous, making them harder for predators to find. For this reason, rock piles and hollowed out logs along with other shelters found close to the ground make good building sites for P. dorsalis nests. However, they can also be commonly found in more open field areas. Within urban areas, P. dorsalis have also chosen to build nests within shrubbery and on the lower border of roofs. Nests are generally small and open- faced with no envelope surround the structure. They are typically 1- tiered and can house up to 75 adult wasps.

== Colony cycle ==
=== Colony initiation ===
Colony initiation in Polistes wasps usually occurs in the spring. Sometimes a handful of female wasps, otherwise known as foundresses, who have mated start the colony. Together these females will take care of their young in a cooperative manner. In other instances, a single foundress that takes care of a brood consisting of solely her own eggs initiates a nest. Even within a colony of multiple foundresses, the largest of the females tends to quickly assume the role of queen. This foundress then becomes the sole egg layer in the colony. The other foundresses then will become helper subordinates and no longer contribute in reproductive duties.

=== Colony growth and decline ===
Early in May, the first of the wasps start to emerge. From the start, they fulfill their role as the workers of the colony. These female wasps take on the role of subordinates. They serve by taking care of the brood, young and old, aiding to everyone in the nest. They do so all the while searching for food to maintain the well being of the colony. These workers will assume this helping duty for their entire life, but in the event that the queen goes missing or dies, a worker will readily assume the queen role. By this time, the queen will also have made an effort to drive off any remaining female foundresses that helped initiate the colony, if applicable. This will make room, enabling newly emerged wasps to contribute to the colony. The colony will start to decline when workers start dying either from old age or due to a drop in brood care. When replacements are no longer emerging, the colony will decrease in numbers until the next reproductive phase.

== Behavior ==
=== Dominance hierarchy ===
While there is no distinct morphological caste within Polistes dorsalis colonies, a dominance hierarchy is established which reflects differing behaviors based on the role a wasp plays within the colony. Physically, most females within the colony are able to produce and lay eggs, however, the queen has monopolized this role. A reproductive division of labor has developed, as worker females are either sterile or partly so. In addition to reproductive differences, labor roles can also be established. Roles of P. dorsalis are somewhat fixed as the worker females know to take care of the brood and maintain the colony instead of laying eggs of their own. Sometimes subordinates will also engage in tasks that are higher in risk, like leaving the nest to forage in dangerous environments. They also forage more for nectar and prey hunting whereas the dominant wasp might collect nutrients that are higher in fiber. The queen herself fulfills the role of regulating the work activity of her subordinate wasps. This division of labor might be seems to be a beneficial system to be followed because it increases the efficiency of the hive.

==== Development of dominance ====
There might be advantages due to certain wasp groups to having a dominance hierarchy. For one, it is an opportunity for an individual to reap the benefits of obtaining a high rank. For example, the queen wasp is well taken care of by the worker females because they are the subordinates. In addition, establishing a stable structure can lead to reduced costs for within-group conflict. There's also less aggression among members, especially towards the queen, unless a subordinate wasp wants to take over. Even then, this dominance hierarchy will once again be established. Dominance behavior is prevalent during various stages of Polistes dorsalis' colony cycle. In the "founding phase", an individual wasp can start building a colony alone then give rise to her first brood of workers. Then in the "worker phase" remain dominant by serving as the queen. Polistes wasp might exert aggressive behavior to maintain dominance like biting at other wasps or "falling fight" in which both wasps fall from the nest. The queen usually stands erect over the subordinates, who typically crouch and lower their antennae in the queen's presence. A queen can also force subordinates to leave the nest when new offspring emerge. Short-term dominance is established quickly through intense interactions, whereas long-term dominance develops after physiological or reproductive hierarchy is maintained and prominent within a colony.

==== Role of chemicals in distinguishing dominance ====
However, in Polistes wasps, the dominant female's presence alone isn't able to suppress other subordinates from laying eggs and reproducing. It is hypothesized that various factors play into this differentiation of roles. The presence of pheromones for instance might have something to do with it on a biological level. Aggressive displays of the queen also serve to suppress reproductive tendencies of worker females within a colony. Cuticular hydrocarbon profiles (CHC) might also be a way to assess the ranking of dominance within a colony. This profile is applicable to the majority of social insects and is associated with fertility. Profiles of the queen differ from that of workers and subordinates. Co- foundresses are able to assess dominance of another wasp due to their CHCs. Hydrocarbons can also change within a wasp when rankings change within a colony. Queen wasps have also been observed to coat her eggs with CHCs to distinguish these eggs from ones potentially laid by subordinates. This would aid in workers destroying other eggs that do not have this specific chemical mix, exemplifying worker policing.

=== Altruism ===
In many social wasps, in this case Polistes dorsalis, genetic relatedness seems to be a main factor that contributes to altruistic behaviors. Other eusocial insects tend to exhibit these behaviors as well. Hamilton's rule once again applies: altruistic behavior will be favored when the benefit to its relative compared to the cost of its fitness for being altruistic is greater. There's also the need to take into account their degree of relatedness. Hence, if relatedness is high so are the benefits of altruistic behavior to the individual. If relatedness is low, the cost of being altruistic might be more than the benefit, decreasing the likelihood of altruistic behaviors. It is proposed that even the variation in levels of altruism will differ among species, and are perhaps higher when individuals have higher relatedness. However, a predicted hypothesis that the frequency of subordinates and relatedness would be positively correlated is yet to be proven. This might be due to variations in the cost/benefit analysis that is factored in when deciding whether or not to help. There are also other factors that play into wasps behaving in altruistic ways, not due to relatedness, but perhaps due to reciprocal altruism or other intrinsic rewards.

== Kin selection ==
=== Genetic relatedness within colonies ===
Hamilton's rule is a key part of the study of relatedness in that it notes the relative importance of direct reproduction compared to an alternative of indirect reproduction. Within eusocial societies haplodiploidy plays a role when considering relatedness. For wasps, the queen is 1/2 related to worker wasps. Full sisters have even higher relatedness than this, with 3/4 shared genes. This accounts for why it might be desirable for wasps to want the production of sisters rather than having their own daughters. From a genetic standpoint, it would be more advantageous to have more genes spread through a sister wasp than daughter wasp. In addition, if subordinate foundresses started reproducing, the average relatedness within the colony would be lowered. To calculate relatedness, the coefficient of relatedness, or "r", can be solved for using the formula: r=Σ(0.5)^L, where L= number of generation links. This will put into numeric form the value for all possible pathways. The genetic relatedness between individuals can then be compared through these values.

=== Kin recognition and discrimination ===
Investigation of nest mate recognition within hymenopterans has been of scientific interest, not only to better understand interactions within various species but also to potentially controlling social insects that have an economic impact. In social wasps, Polistes wasps have been used as a model of study to figure out mechanisms of kin recognition. Kin recognition can be coded by observing various treatments of certain wasps to others from their nest of origin versus treatment to foreign wasps not related. It was shown in species of Polistes that foundresses of a certain colony were more tolerant of the present of sister foundresses that did not live in the colony versus introduction of non- related foundresses. Wasps tend to learn certain recognition cues when they are born into a nest. These recognition cues tend not to be in the form of visuals or sounds. Usually it is the presence of chemical cues that are shared between nest mates that allow for identification of relatives.

=== Sensory systems ===
There's also a hypothesis that sensory systems can evolve over time due to shaping by signals. The facet diameter of a wasp's eye is related to the amount of surface area of the eye, which is an important part of the process of visual signaling. There also seems to be interaction between the surface area of the eye and species with smaller eyes, showing a greater increase in maximum facet diameter for small eyes compared to species with larger eyes. Visual signally has actually influenced eye morphology within Polistes species. Larger facets are typically expected to improve signal detection due to improved visual resolution. Selection might have a role in improved sensory inputs. Polistes live in open areas and rely on visual indicators of danger. Therefore, it is of importance how signal communication and detection is effected and evolves over time. Sensory systems might be dynamic entities as they are important for wasp functions.

=== Worker–queen conflict ===
==== Queen's interest ====
Due to distinct differences in relatedness that are present in some eusocial societies, haplodiploidy can also lead to conflicts between worker interests and the interests of the queen. There can be differences in desired sex ratios as producing more of a certain gendered wasp might be more beneficial to either the queen or worker. From the queen's prospective, it would be optimal to produce equal numbers of sons and daughters. There is not a difference in relatedness between the genders, as the queen would pass on half of her genes in both instances. A 50:50 sex ratio might lead to the same amount of reproductive success, despite differences in gender. The queen might even resort to aggressive behaviors in order to prevent other female wasps within the colony from reproducing.

==== Workers' interest ====
From a worker standpoint, the queen's production of male wasps might actually be more beneficial compared to the progenies of other workers. For male workers there would be a 3/4 relatedness, which is greater than the 2/5 relatedness of progeny to other workers. Worker policing might be a result of this to prevent the laying of eggs other than those produced by the queen. There might also be presence of a self- policing allele that could increase in frequency if it became advantageous for each individual wasp. If it became common for workers to police themselves in reproductive matters, workers that decide to reproduce on their own would not have a selective advantage. There would also be an increase in worker policing if perhaps there was a difference between queen-produced and worker-produced eggs. It is suggested that there might be a pheromonal difference, which would differentiate between the two means of growing a colony.

== Interaction with other species ==
=== Sting ===
Many wasps are known to use their stinging abilities as a means of tactic defense against diverse predators. The physical stinger is distinguished as the part of the wasp that physically injects venom into offenders. The sting, on the other hand, refers to the actual event. The effectiveness of stings tends to be dependent on the level of pain inflicted over the toxicity or paralyzing ability of certain types of venom. On a pain scale developed by Christopher K. Starr in this cited article, Polistes dorsalis ranks in the 2 range on a 5-point scale (from no pain to traumatically painful) which is pretty consistent in comparison to other Polistes species. A number of factors play into the intensity of sting from each individual wasp. The size of the colony, or the size of the aggregation, effects how easily they are to attack when disturbed or feel threatened. It seems that with larger groups of wasps, less provocation is needed for them to attack. Also, the size of the predator and their pain tolerance would also affect this relative pain scale. Smaller animals typically have smaller thresholds for pain than do larger ones. Toxicity, while not the key determinant of effectiveness also play a role, in that venom of higher toxicity tends to be more painful.

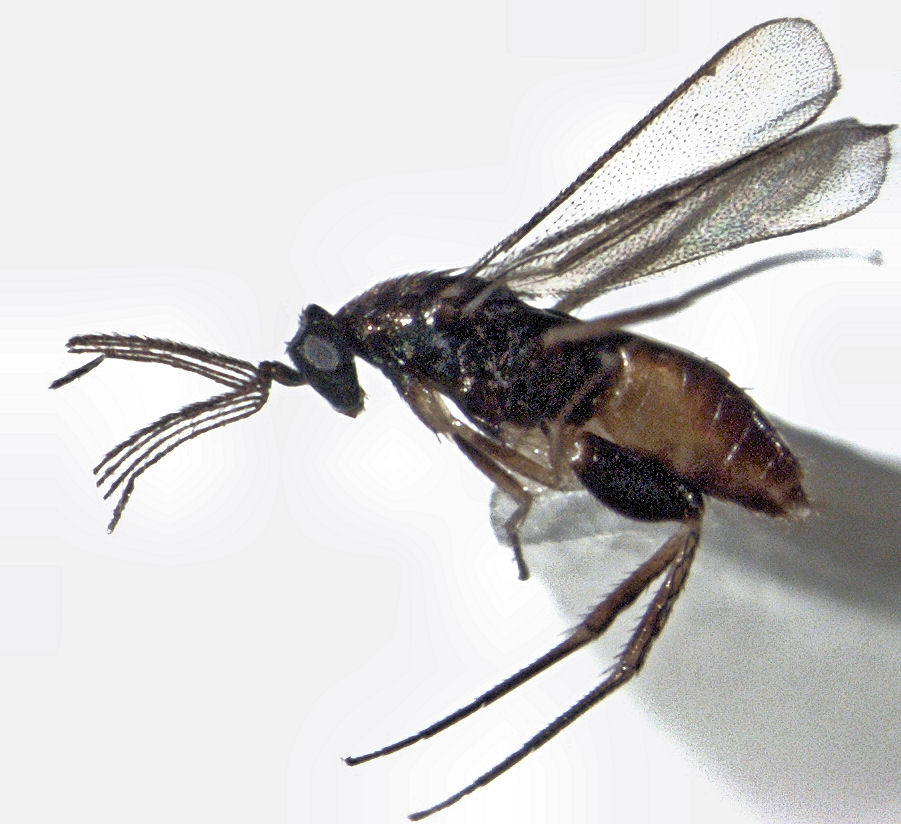
An Elasmus male

=== Parasitism ===
Elasmus polistis Burks is an ectoparasite, a parasite that lives on the outside of its hosts. Larvae of Polistes wasps have been preyed upon by this brood parasite. Elasmus polistis Burk is even categorized to be a primary parasite of various types of Polistes, specifically within the United States. Female adult E. polistis take advantage of early- stage Polistes dorsalis pupae, when they are still in the capped cells within the nest, by laying their own eggs on top of these immobile Polistes pupae. In one case there were up to 103 E. polistis pupae discovered on one Polistes host. When these parasitic pupae emerge from the egg as larvae, they feed on the P. dorsalis pupae until only inedible materials remain. Their excreted fecal matter is then used to build a wall of defense on the cell's closed end to protect themselves against potential Polistes wasps that would want to attack them.

== Human importance ==
=== Antimicrobial peptides from venom ===
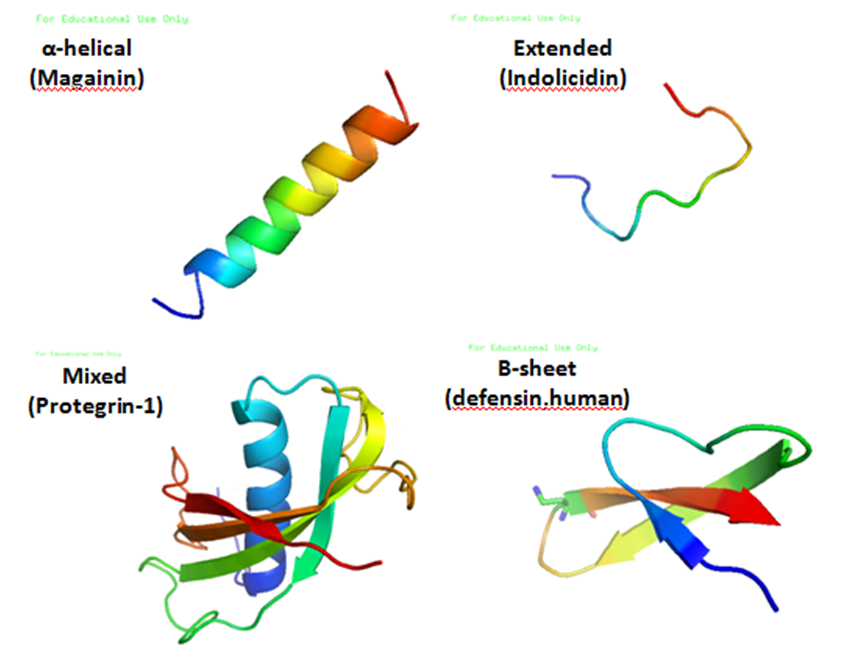
Various structures of antimicrobial peptides

The ability of bacterial pathogens to develop resistance towards conventional antibiotics is a growing issue prominent within today's society. Furthermore, this growth occurs at a significantly fast pace leading scientists to turn towards other methods of controlling this issue. Antimicrobial peptides (AMPs) come from natural sources and seem to be a major focus for scientists. Experimentation with the unique mechanisms of these peptides has given scientists the possibilities for developing new drugs in the fight against bacteria. AMPs have the potential to kill a variety of microorganisms and serve as a part of the body's defense with involvement in host repair and dealing with adaptive immune responses. They are also antimicrobial resistant which gives them advantage when forming a treatment. Also, due to the composition of their membranes, most antimicrobial peptides are only toxic to bacteria but not eukaryotic cells. This is the basis for interest in the venom of Polistes dorsalis. Members of the Vespidae family were studied and shown to contain peptides with α-helical conformations in the venom. This conformation and its amphipathic properties allow these peptides to break through the bacteria membrane and assemble which results in the collapse of the membrane, and death of the bacteria. Scientists work to modify the structure of these AMPs to make them more amphipathic, which will contribute to antimicrobial activity. The venom from Polistes dorsalis, therefore is of pharmacological interest.

=== Pollination ===
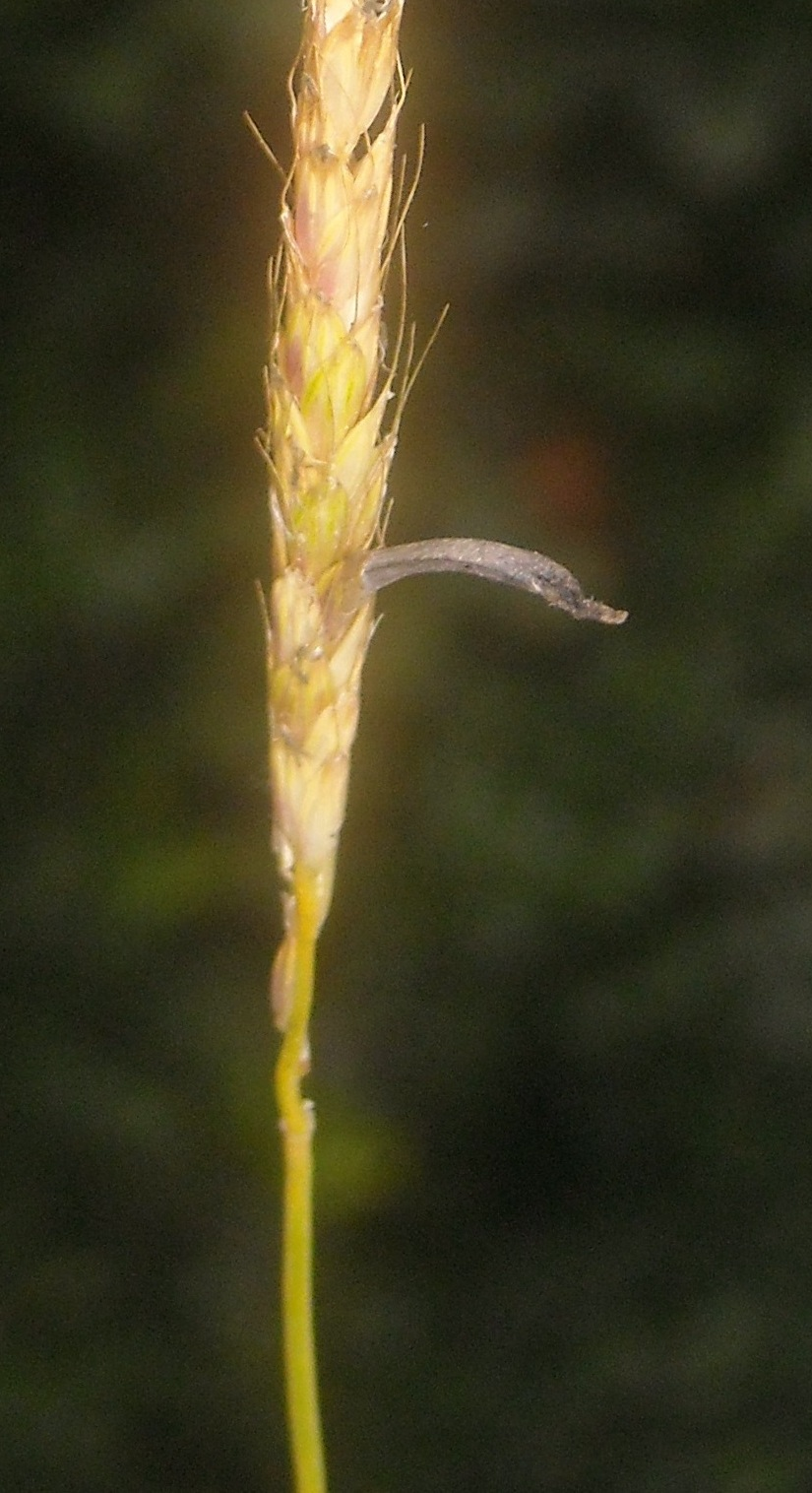
Sclerotium of Claviceps purpurea on Alopecurus myosuroides

Ergot is a type of fungus that tends to grow on cereals and grasses, including rye. The fungus Claviceps spp. infects the flowering head and replaces grain of the rye with an ergot that's a hard and compact fungal mycelium, deep purple in color. In addition, sweet ergot honeydew oozes from these flowering heads. Insects often feed on this exudate and serve as vectors that carry it from source to source. Examination of Polistes dorsalis during their foraging behavior found presence of fungal conidia on various parts of their body including antennae, mouthparts, and in their gut. Therefore, this species of wasp has been identified as one of these insects, potentially transmitting this causal ergot fungus. This is part of the wasp's foraging behavior, as it is focused on exclusively locating fungal infected grasses and collecting this ergot honeydew. P. dorsalis carries the droplets in their mouthparts from infected grass like Paspalum dilatatum Pior, then crawls or moves through hopping flights towards other florets in the area. Polistes can also differentiate infected grass heads from uninfected ones, and usually land on uninfected grasses for grooming purposes only. Stopping on these grooming sites increase the likelihood of them serving as vectors for the spread of fungal infection, in addition to visiting various grass species during foraging.
