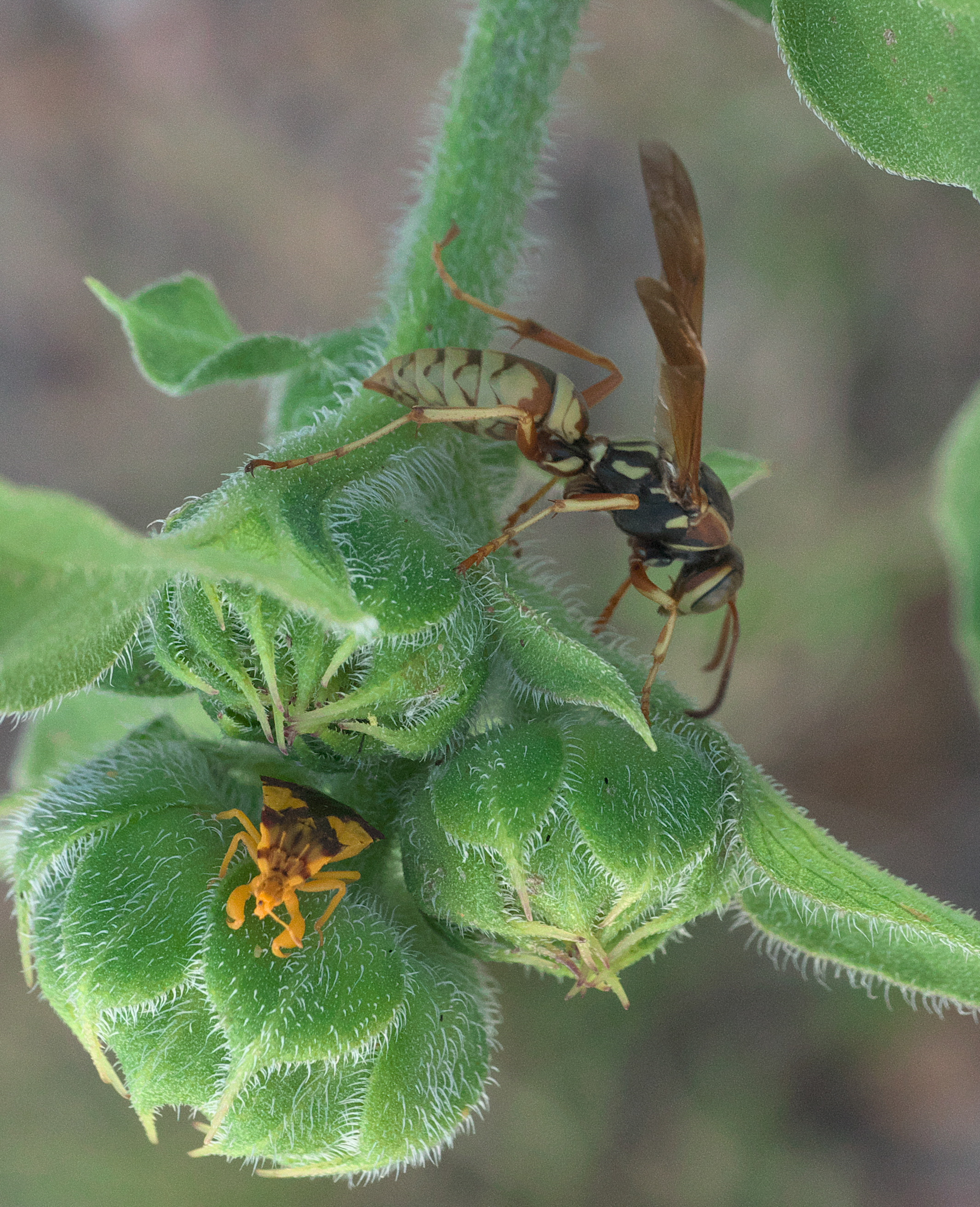

Scientific classification
- Domain: Eukaryota
- Kingdom: Animalia
- Phylum: Arthropoda
- Class: Insecta
- Order: Hymenoptera
- Family: Vespidae
- Subfamily: Polistinae
- Genus: Polistes
- Species: P. aurifer

Binomial name
- Polistes aurifer Saussure, 1853

Synonyms
- Polistes anaheimensis Provancher, 1888; Polistes fuscatus var. centralis Hayw., 1933; Polistes fuscatus var. utahensis Hayw., 1933; Polistes connectens Bequaert, 1940; Polistes montanus Bequaert, 1940; Polistes centralis (Hayw., 1933); Polistes utahensis (Hayw., 1933); Polistes fuscatus ssp. montanus (Bequaert, 1940); Polistes fuscatus ssp. aurifer (Saussure, 1853) O.Richards, 1978; Polistes fuscatus ssp. centralis Hayw., 1933

= Polistes aurifer =

Species of wasp

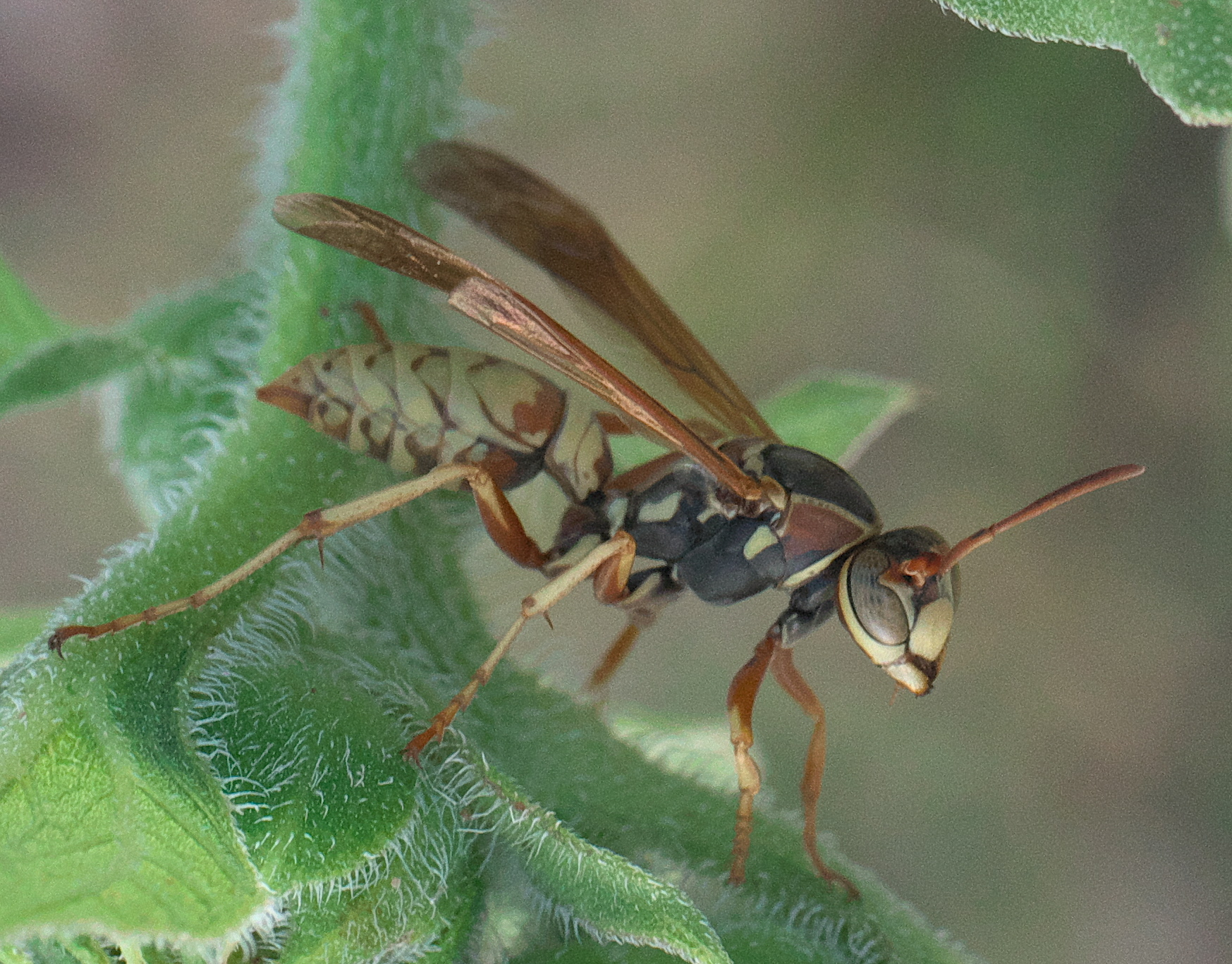
Golden paper wasp, Polistes aurifer

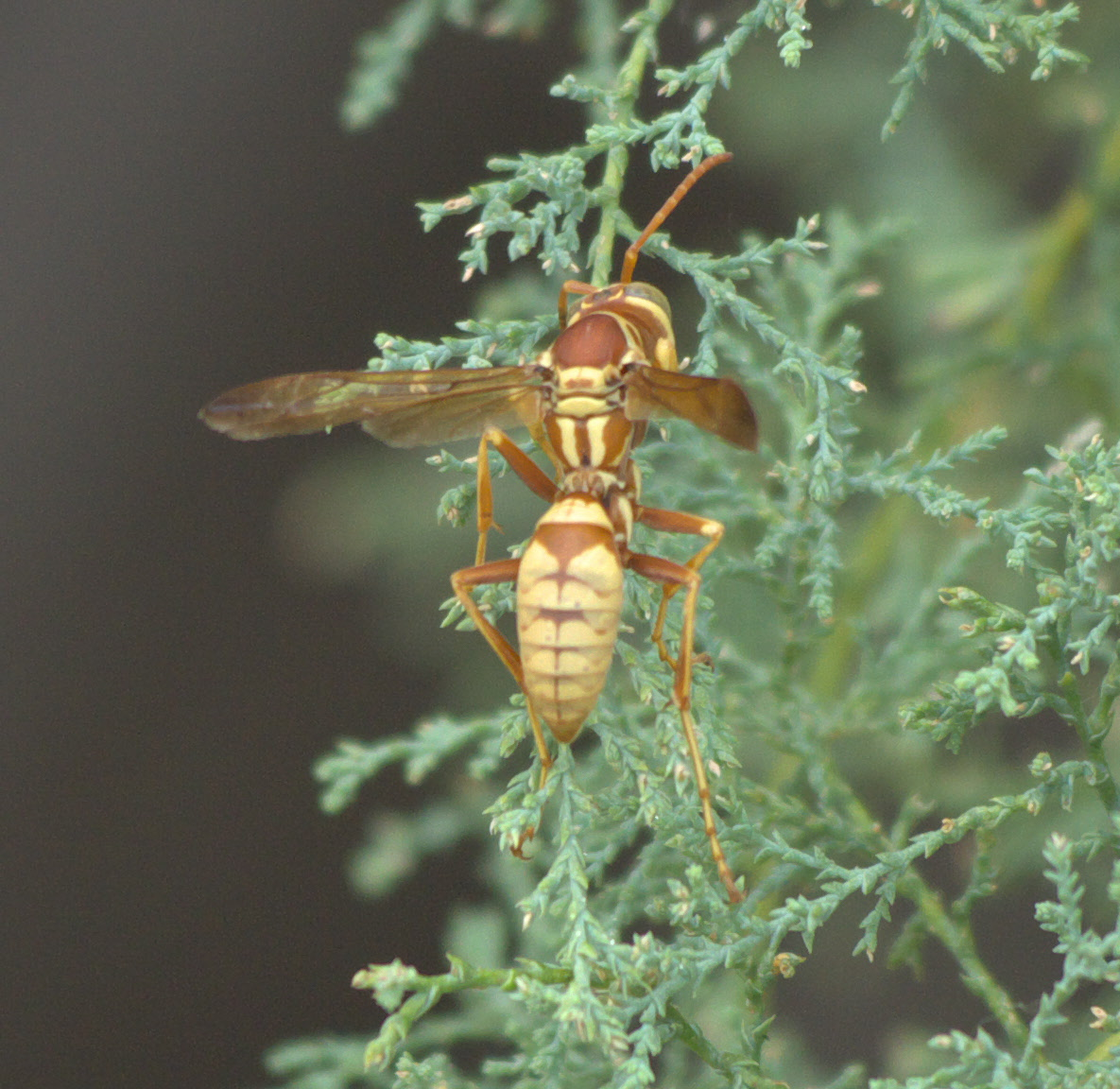
Golden paper wasp, Polistes aurifer

Polistes aurifer, the golden paper wasp, is a species of paper wasp in the genus Polistes of the family Vespidae. It occurs in the western part of North America, from southern Canada through the United States to northern Mexico.

== Taxonomy ==
It was first described as a new species by Henri Louis Frédéric de Saussure in 1853. Roy Snelling synonymised a number of taxa to this species in 1954. Owain Richards treated this taxon as a subspecies of P. fuscatus in his 1978 work, which was followed in subsequent works.

=== Etymology ===
The etymology of the specific epithet aurifex is from the Latin language, where it means a 'goldsmith' or 'one who works with gold'. This word is derived from the Latin word aurum, meaning 'gold', combined with the suffix -fer, derived from the word facio and meaning '-bearing', '-carrying' or '-bringing', together giving 'gold-bearer'.

== Description ==
The morphology of the male genitals are very diagnostic for the species. The species has different inter-grading colour patterns depending on geography. Northern specimens are often mostly black, with ample yellow markings but with the ferruginous (rusty red) colour being very restricted. In populations from the southwestern USA forms with an almost completely yellow metasoma are more common. In some southern US and northwestern Mexican populations the ferruginous colour predominates, with the black colour severely restricted.

=== Similar species ===
It has been confused with extremely xanthic specimens of P. apachus. It has also been confused with P. fuscatus. Adults of either sex can be distinguished from this species by the characteristic of having a ferruginous dorsal surface of the first, and sometimes the following, flagellomeres. In P. fuscatus this surface is darkly coloured. The wings are a more yellowish colour in P. aurifer. Furthermore P. aurifer possesses a pair of large yellow patches on the second tergum; these spots are usually disc-shaped, sometimes hidden and confluent with neighbouring yellow in especially xanthic individuals.

== Distribution ==
In Canada it has been recorded in southernmost areas of the provinces of British Columbia (including southern Vancouver Island), Alberta and Saskatchewan.

In the USA it has been recorded in Arizona, California, Colorado, far west North Dakota, western South Dakota, Idaho, westernmost Kansas, Montana, western Nebraska, Nevada, New Mexico, Oregon, far west Texas, Utah, Washington and Wyoming (a single record in the far northwest).

In Mexico it has been seen in the states of Baja California, Baja California Sur, Chihuahua, Coahuila, Nuevo León and northern Sonora.

Adventive populations have also been recorded in Hawaii, Johnston Atoll, Niihau and the Society Islands. A single specimen was also caught in Prince Edward Island in 1973.

== Ecology ==
This is an eusocial wasp which nests in sheltered locations. Adults have been seen from January to November in more southern locations such as California or Arizona, from April to October in British Columbia in the north of the range, from April to November in more higher and continental areas such as Colorado, or having an even more restricted season in northern continental areas such as Alberta or Saskatchewan. It is parasitised upon by the endoparasitoid Xenos peckii and an unidentified Gordius species, a type of horsehair worm.

== Conservation ==
The IUCN has not evaluated this species' conservation status.
