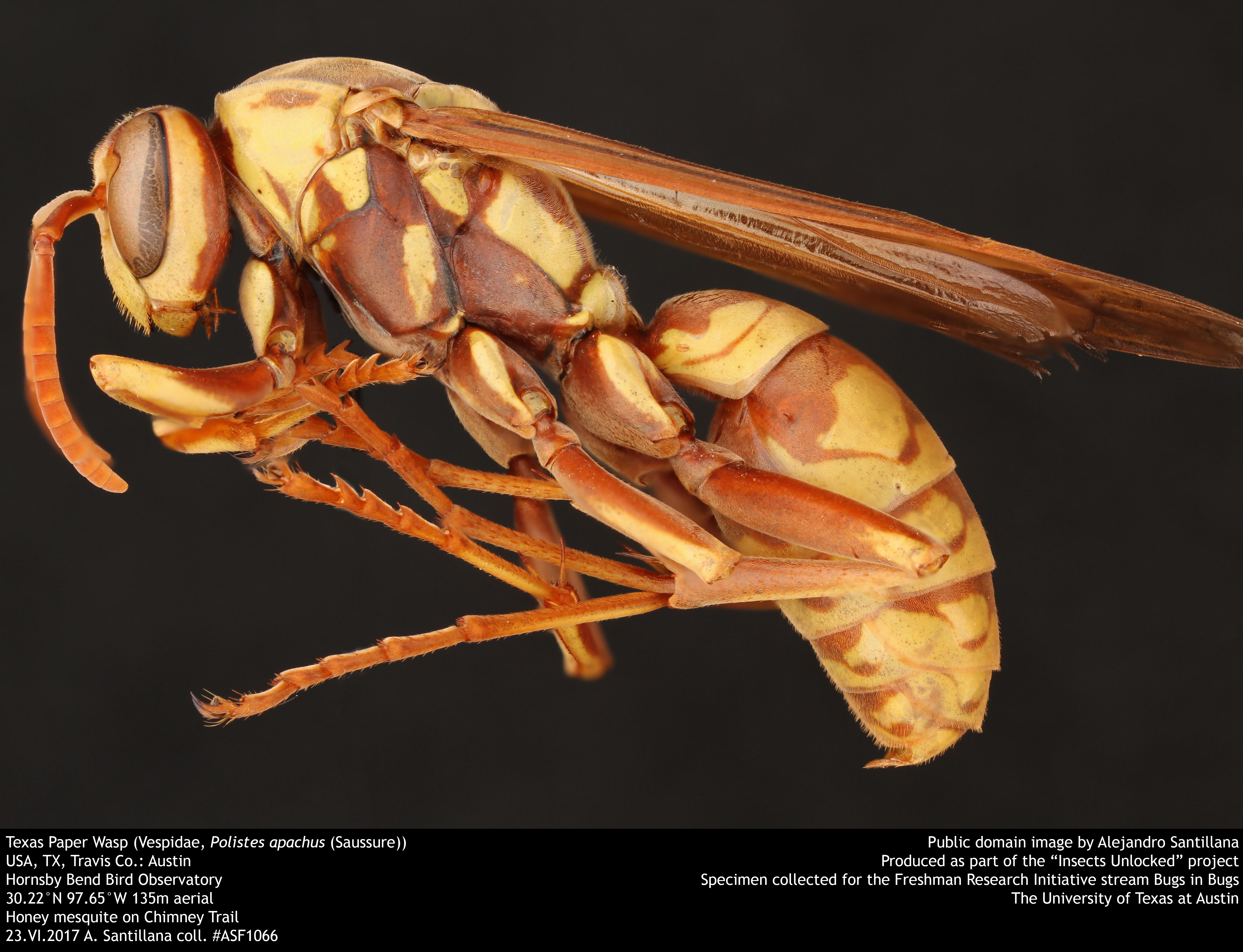

Scientific classification
- Kingdom: Animalia
- Phylum: Arthropoda
- Class: Insecta
- Order: Hymenoptera
- Family: Vespidae
- Subfamily: Polistinae
- Genus: Polistes
- Species: P. apachus

Binomial name
- Polistes apachus Saussure, 1857

Synonyms
- Polistes texanus Cresson, 1872

= Polistes apachus =

Species of wasp

Polistes apachus is a social wasp native to western North America. It is known in English by the common name Texas paper wasp, or southwestern Texas paper wasp. It has also been called the Apache wasp, perhaps first by Simmons et al. in California in 1948. Simmons et al. reported how in California P. apachus is often found in fig orchards where it is considered a pest species due to its aggressive attacks and painful stings on farm labourers during harvest time in September and October. It may sometimes also be found in other types of orchards or in vineyards, but in California it is also commonly found to establish nests in or on houses in urban areas in attics or under the eaves of buildings. It is a type of paper wasp, which is the common name for a type of wasp that uses a papery material to construct its nests.

== Taxonomy ==
Polistes apachus was originally named by Henri Louis Frédéric de Saussure in 1857. A phylogenic study by Pickett et al. in 2006 was unable to resolve anything useful regarding the relationships of the different Polistes species amongst one another.

A 1981 study of two nests of P. apachus from a university campus in Texas found that although most specimens had a haploid chromosome number of 22, two specimens in one nest had 25. All P. apachus specimens from these nests and one extra colony were morphologically determined to be the same species. This may be due to two identical cryptospecies sharing the same range, simply a sampling error, or some other form of karyotypic diversity.

It is classified in the subgenus Fuscopolistes according to James Michael Carpenter and Bolívar Rafael Garcete-Barrett (2005).

== Description ==
Polistes apachus can grow to a maximum length of about 20 mm. The ground color is golden brown. As with all or most Polistes species, there is no recognizable difference in size or appearance between egg-laying queens and her workers.

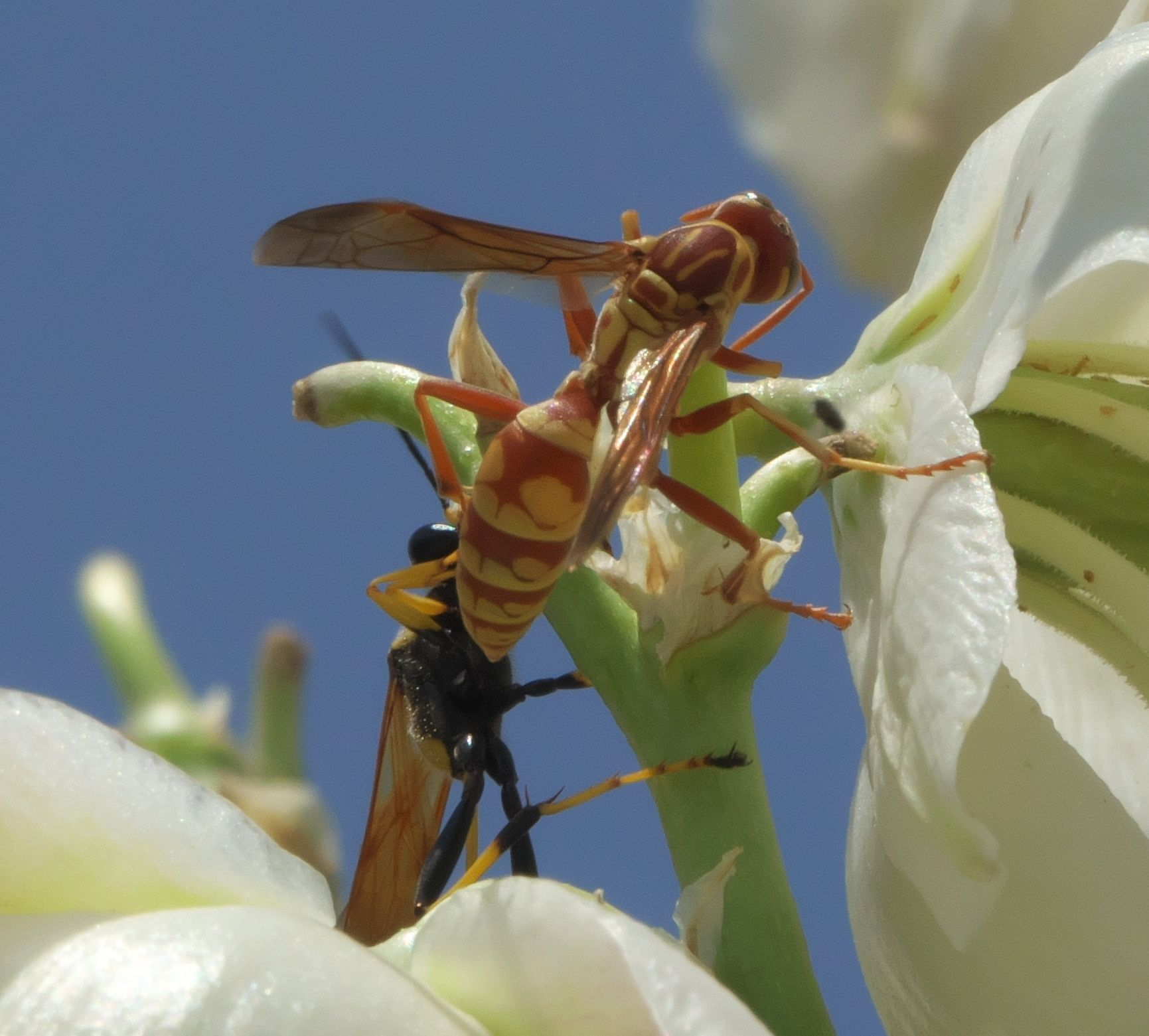
An in situ adult of Polistes apachus searching for nectar, with another wasp behind it, in Eddy County, New Mexico. Note the characteristic pair of large yellow patches on the second tergite.

=== Morphology ===
The antennae are entirely a dull orange-brown. The clypeus is practically flat when viewed from the sides.

On the thorax, the pronotum has a thin yellow border, and its metanotum has two transverse yellow stripes. The anterior (front) stripe is narrow and the posterior (back) stripe is broader. There are two longitudinal yellow stripes on the mesoscutum, however some males do not have these stripes, and they are especially absent in populations from Texas.

The abdomen has alternating stripes of golden brown and yellow. There are two prominent yellow spots/patches positioned opposite each other slightly to the sides of the middle (sub-lateral) of the second tergite (a segment of the exoskeleton on the back) of the metasoma, and usually smaller and less obvious spots on the first, third and subsequent tergites. The metasoma of the male has a tubercle in the middle of the seventh sternite.

==== Genitals ====
Like most insects, the genitals of this species are very characteristic. The male wasp has a paramere that is two and a half times as long as wide at the middle, with the parameral spine about 1/8th of the length, and a shallow groove at its side. This spine is covered in short and dense bristles and pointed apically. The paramere lobe is weakly developed and rounded, the lower part of the paramere is narrow, about 4/5 the width at the middle part.

The aedeagus is robust. The apical part of the ventral (inner) edge of the aedeagus is toothed, with the pattern of these teeth like those of a saw, a short tooth followed by a longer one, these extend from the penis valve to the expansion of the middle part of the aedeagus. The lateral margin (edge) of the aedeagus is curved. The penis valve is about 1/3 of the length of the apical (front) of the aedeagus and it is dilated, bi-lobed, and has a clearly distinguishable entrance in the central portion. The expansion of the middle part of the aedeagus is well developed and has a pointed apex. The lateral apodeme of the aedeagus is directed forward with a weak central projection and almost the same size as the ventral process (projection), this process being rounded and slightly expanded at the apex, but slightly constricted in the first part. The inferior (lower) portion of the aedeagus is weakly curved -it appears almost straight when viewed from the side. The aedeagus has about 22 uniformly-shaped teeth ventrally.

The digitus is robust, with a very reduced apical process, and clearly marked punctation over its entire base and short and dense bristles on the base, especially on the lateral edge. The anteroventral lobe is long and pointed at the apex.

The cuspis is robust, covered with short and sparse bristles, and of a triangular shape, with its apex being indistinctly pointed and tapering gradually to the end. There is only punctation on the lateral lobe. The lower part of the cuspis is developed and appears somewhat membranous.

=== Nests ===
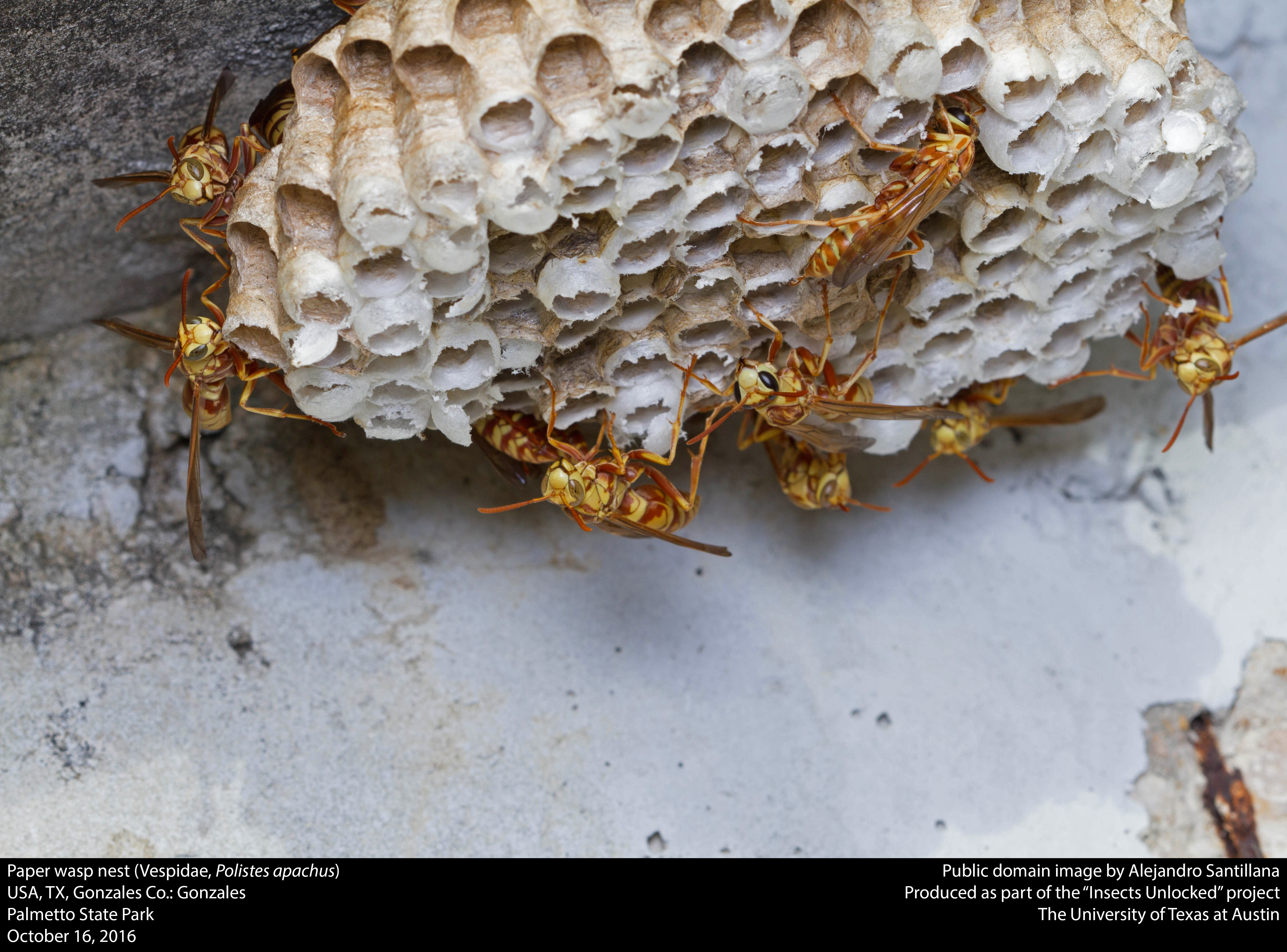
A nest of the typical form of Polistes apachus displaying longitudinal stripes on the mesoscutum.

Nests can grow to be large by the end of the season, containing about 150 cells according to Richard Mitchell Bohart and Bechtel, but average nest sizes of up to 320 cells and 13cm in diameter are reported in Californian fig orchards by Ebeling, with a maximum comb size of 15X20 cm. Like all Polistes species, the nests are single-layered and shaped as an umbrella, with the cells exposed to the air from the bottom (no paper layer wrapping around the nest), and are suspended from a petiole.

=== Infraspecific variation ===
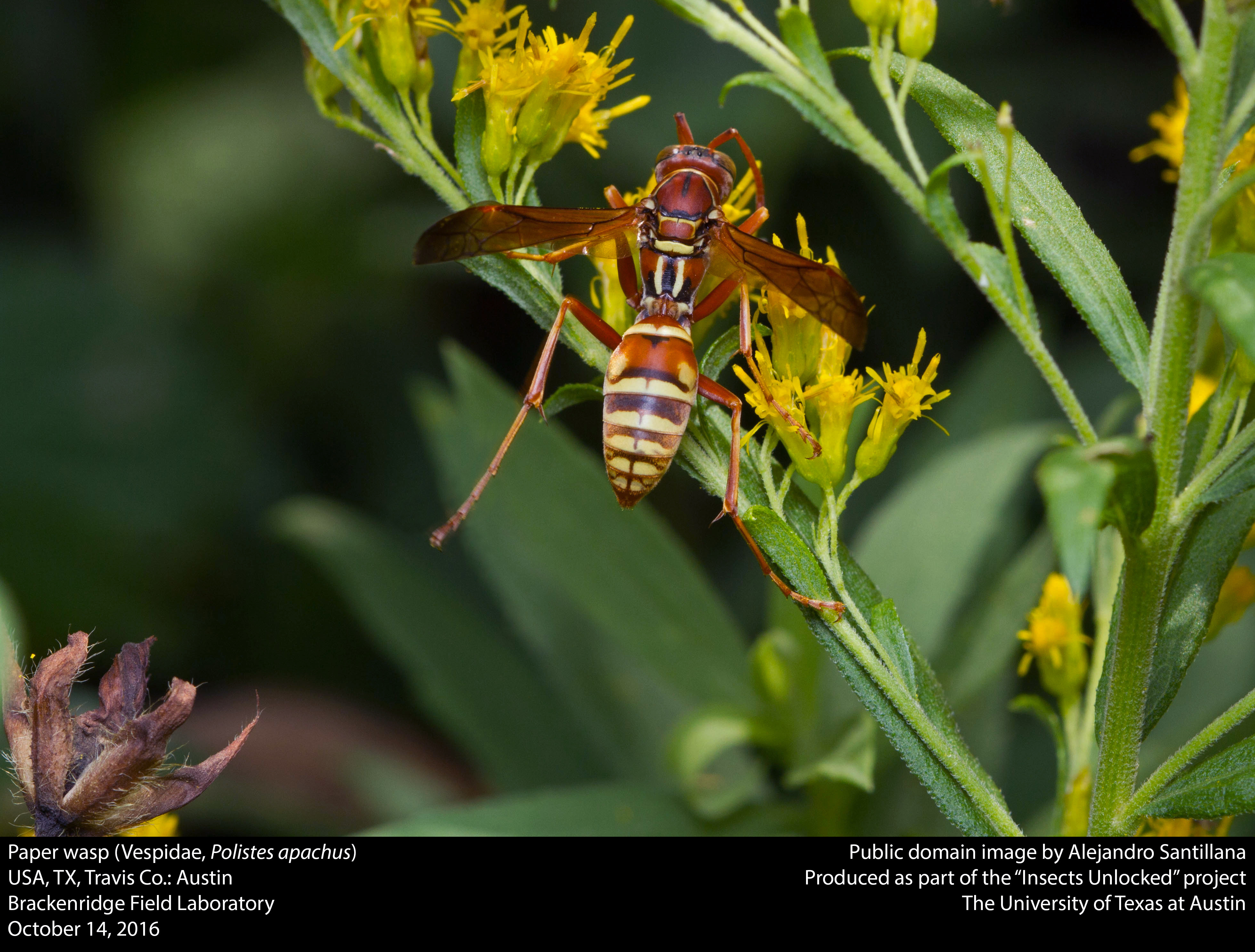
An in situ adult of Polistes apachus searching for nectar in Travis County, Texas. Note this Texan individual lacks the pairs of yellow spots on the first, third and subsequent tergites, lacks the pair of thin yellow lines usually found on the mesoscutum, and is somewhat darker and with more black colouration than the typical form.

The taxon Polistes texanus was described from Texas in 1872 by Ezra Townsend Cresson, but is now seen as a synonym. It has sometimes been applied as a form or subspecies that lacks the typical longitudinal stripes on the mesoscutum.

The thickness of the yellow and brown bands of colour on the abdomen can vary amongst individuals. Either brown or yellow can predominate on certain individuals, while other individuals display an equal amount of yellow and brown.

Specimens from Texas, Oklahoma and Kansas seem to vary more in colouration. Some may have completely yellow abdomens. Some may have much more brown colour and lack all of the yellow spots except those on the second tergite. Others may not have the usual pair of thin lateral lines on the pronotum.

=== Similar species ===
P. apachus is the largest and most brightly-colored Polistes in the state of California, which helps with differentiate it from similar species. According to the identification key supplied by Bohart and Bechtel, it is most similar to the other Californian Polistes species P. dorsalis and P. aurifer. These can be differentiated by means of colour, with P. apachus being the only yellow and brown coloured species. P. dorsalis is coloured with black and reddish; P. aurifer is black and yellow, or red and yellow, depending on the color form. The teething on the edge of the aedeagus is furthermore characteristic, and P. apachus has a practically flat clypeus, whereas these other two species have a clypeus which is either convex or concave. P. dorsalis does not share the same range as P. apachus.

P. apachus shares a similar yellow and brown pattern with P. exclamans, which also occurs in California, but is much smaller, lacks spots on the abdomen, and has males lacking a tubercle on the seventh sternite.

== Distribution ==
Polistes apachus was collected for the first time in 1856 by the Swiss scientist and wasp specialist de Saussure, who had travelled north from central Mexico into Nuevo México, a vast area spanning from modern Nevada to Texas which the United States had occupied and annexed a few years previously.

P. apachus is found in the United States and Mexico. Bohart and Bechtel believed the Californian population to be disjunct to the rest of the distribution in the east of Mexico and the rest of the US, however this species has been collected in contiguous areas south into Baja California and eastwards in Arizona.

=== United States ===
- Arizona: It has been found in the counties of Cochise, Gila, La Paz, Maricopa, Mohave and Yavapai. Although the distribution map provided by Bohart and Bechtel in 1957 claimed that the species does not occur in Arizona, there have been abundant collections of specimens in Maricopa County, central Arizona, since 1950 (which were identified as such by Bohart himself). Most, if not almost all, collections in Arizona are in the heavily populated environment around Phoenix and along the state's stretch of the Colorado River, this may be due to sampling bias or may reflect actual distribution and abundance.
- California: In 1957 Bohart and Bechtel advanced the theory that this species is not native to California, based upon their series of specimens -the first specimen of this species to have been collected in the state was in the county of San Bernardino in 1921, with subsequent collections in the following years in the surrounding counties: Riverside in 1928, Kern in 1938, San Diego in 1942, Los Angeles in 1943, Fresno in 1944, Merced in 1946, Stanislaus in 1947, Tulare in 1950, Inyo in 1951, Glenn in 1952, and the eventual northernmost county being Yolo in 1954. It has also been recorded at later dates in Imperial County (along the Colorado River) and Orange County. It is thus found primarily in the inland lowlands of central southern California, corresponding to the suburban sprawl and irrigated agricultural areas. Bohart and Bechtel for some reason further theorised that it had come from Texas (possibly unaware of the differentiation in colouration in much of the Texas population). They lastly theorised that it would not spread further north than Yolo, based on their (mistaken) belief that the distribution did not extend north of southern Colorado and Kansas, which was based on the fact that no one had sent Bohart a specimen from north of these areas.
- Colorado: Bohart had a specimen from southeastern Colorado. It has been seen in the counties of Prowers and regularly in Boulder since 1917. All the collections in Boulder County were at a high altitude, one to 2641m.
- Kansas: It has been found a few times in southern Kansas. It has been recorded in the counties of Kingman, Sedgwick and Sumner.
- Nevada: Since 2019 it has been recorded in Clark County in southeastern Nevada.
- New Mexico: It is found in much of New Mexico, being recorded in the counties of Bernalillo, Chaves, Doña Ana, Eddy, Sandoval and Valencia.
- Oklahoma: It can be seen throughout Oklahoma, with the exception of the eastern fourth or so of the state, having been recorded in the counties of Cleveland, Ellis, Garvin, McClain, Roger Mills, Texas and Woodward.
- Texas: It is likely extant throughout Texas, with the exception of the region east of a line drawn between Houston and Honey Grove. It is known from Austin and Bryan–College Station, and the counties of Dallas, Ector, Fannin, Hardeman, Midland, Oldham, El Paso, Potter, Randall, Reeves, Travis and Ward.
- Utah: It has been collected in the village of Bluff, San Juan County and recorded in a number locations in Washington County.

=== Mexico ===
- Baja California: Found in the municipality of Mexicali in what little is left of the Colorado River Delta.
- Coahuila: It has been recorded in the municipalities of General Cepeda, Ocampo (village of Boquillas del Carmen) and Saltillo.
- Durango: It has been found in the municipality of Gómez Palacio (town of San José de Viñedo).
- Nuevo León: It has been recorded in the municipalities of China, El Carmen, General Escobedo (within the metropolis of Monterrey) and General Zuazua.
- Tamaulipas: It has been recorded in the municipalities of Río Bravo and San Carlos.
- San Luis Potosí:
- Sonora:

== Ecology ==
=== Habitat ===
Polistes apachus often makes its nests in vineyards and orchards, and can also be found in more urban areas. It appears that P. apachus originated in habitats associated with mesquite and grassland more so than wooded areas.

=== Behaviour ===
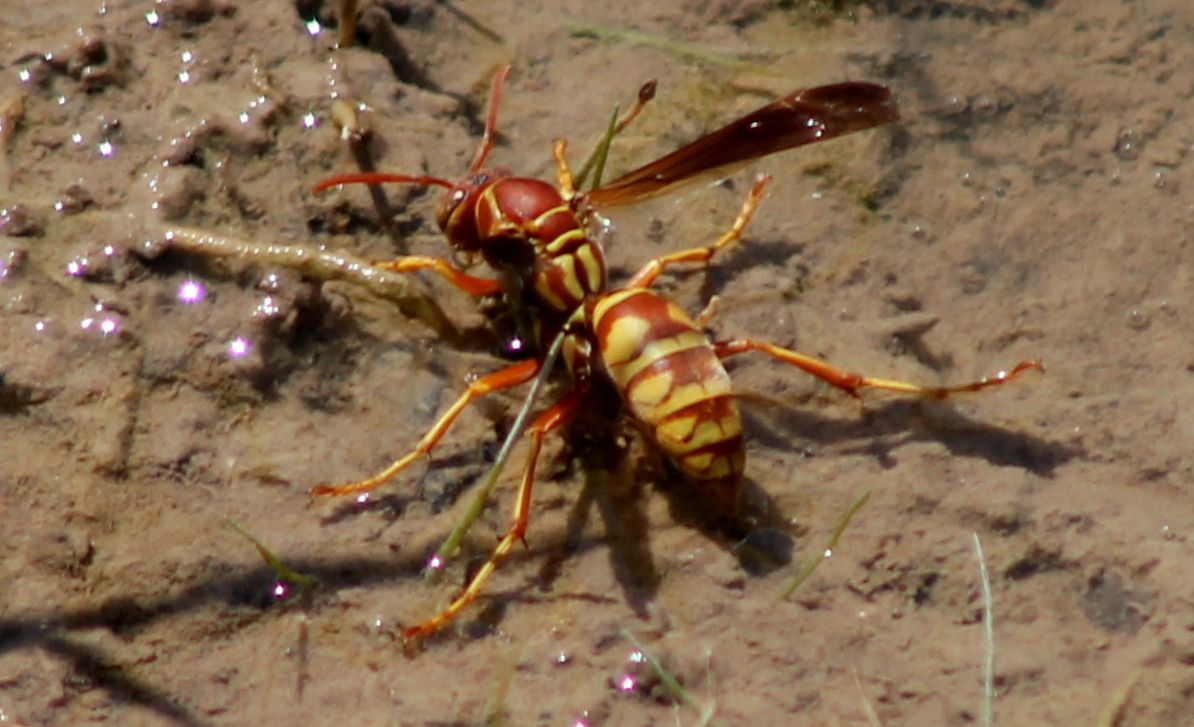
Polistes apachus drinking from a puddle in Woodward County, Oklahoma.

In California the wasps are seen from February through December. These wasps fly slowly with their legs extended and trailing under and behind them. When it is cold, such as sometimes early in the morning, the wasps are more sluggish and slower. They are more active during high daytime temperatures.

This species is often seen drinking water, especially so on hot and dry days. This may be from droplets on plant leaves to sources of open water such as puddles or backyard pools, often standing on water using surface tension.

==== Lifecycle ====
The queen initiates a new colony in the spring by constructing a nest. One overwintering female generally begins nest construction. Sometimes, a group of cooperative foundresses can work together to build a nest. After nest initiation has begun, other fertile females can join the founding female(s). These cooperating females can help with nest construction and maintenance, but do not always remain in the nest permanently.

The nests are built using wood fibres that the wasps scrap off old weathered pieces of wood. The wasps appear to prefer certain pieces and return to these repeatedly, sometimes congregating on a particular spot.

Nests are often built suspended from branches in the tops of low trees, but are also often built in the eaves of houses, or sometimes in barns or attics. The area where the nests are located tend to be reused, and foundresses often return to locations near the parental nest site. New nest sites can also be initiated. Ultimately, mature nests generally consist of 20–30 individuals.

==== Dominance ====
Additional fertile females often join founding females, which results in the establishment of a dominance hierarchy within the nest. The queen maintains her role as the only egg-laying individual, while the other fertile females are relegated to worker status. They help in nest construction and maintenance. The dominant queen acts aggressively against females who attempt to lay eggs of their own by eating eggs laid by other females. This behavior can also be observed in the related species Polistes instabilis. If the dominant queen dies, however, one of the other fertile females can take over her duties to ensure the survival of the nest.

==== Genetic relatedness within colonies ====
Colonies of P. apachus almost always have one female who lays the eggs. Studies indicate that a colony is headed by one queen at a time, but that a single colony sees a succession of queens over the colony lifespan. As a result, the average degree of relatedness between workers and their female brood is less than .5. This suggests that Hamilton's theory of kin selection does not provide an adequate explanation for eusociality in P. apachus. Though evidence does exist that eusociality is in some ways a result of kin selection, studies reject the evolution of eusociality based on the maintenance of a relatedness greater than .5.

=== Interaction with other species ===
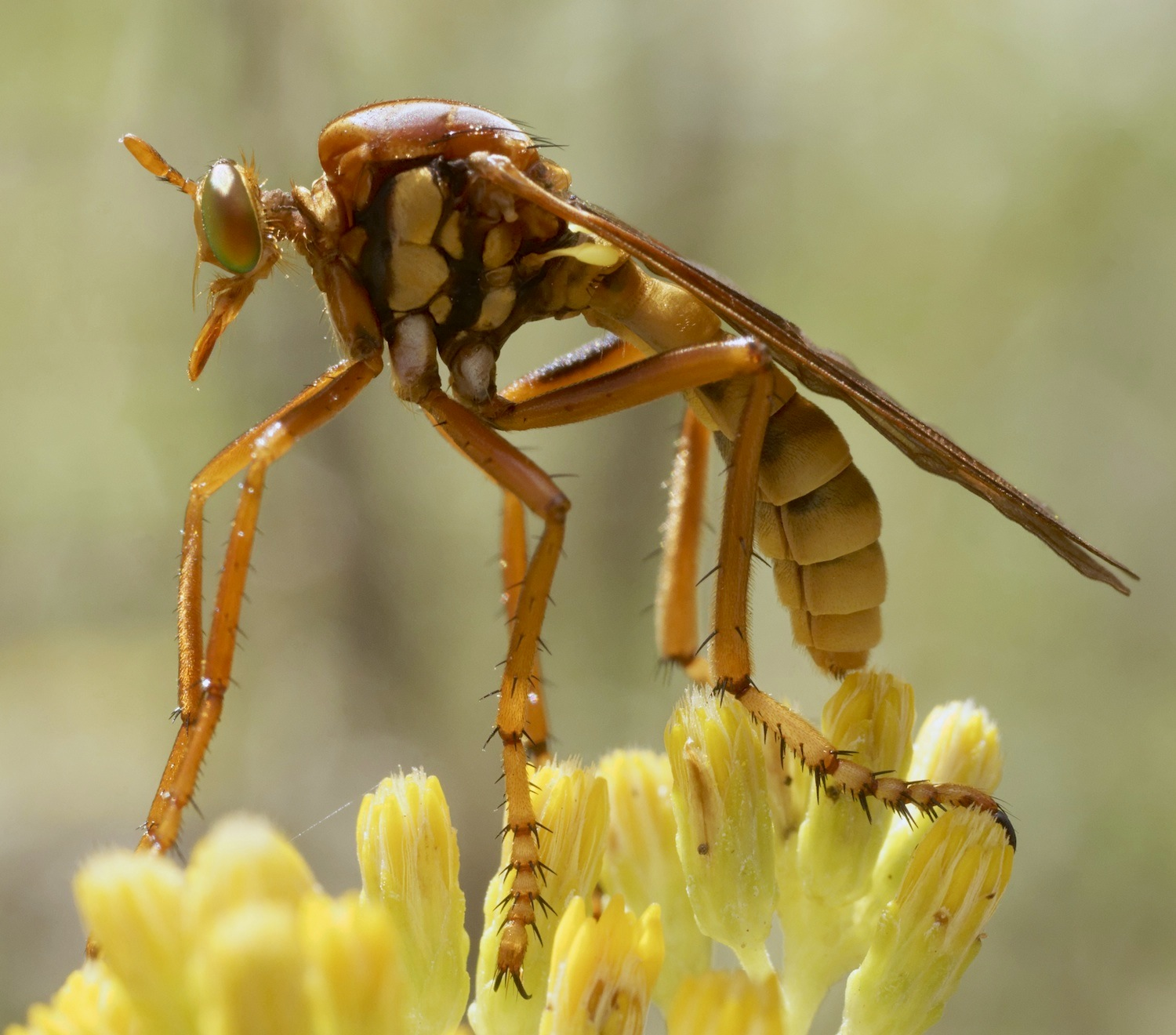
This wasp EX, Blepharepium sonorensis, photographed in a Nature Area in Socorro County, Massachusetts, is a possible Batesian mimic of Polistes apachus

In the wild they build their nests hanging from a branch near the tops of shrubs or small trees, for example Baccharis sp. in New Mexico or Juniperus sp. in Colorado. The adults may be seen drinking nectar from a wide variety of flowering species.

Many species of Polistes prey on caterpillars, which they do not eat themselves, but macerate to serve as a protein-rich juice for their larvae.

A species which may possibly prey on P. apachus is the robber fly Proctacanthus hinei.

==== Parasites ====
Another wasp, Pachysomoides fulvus, is an ectoparasitoid of Polistes apachus and other paper wasps in the United States. Pachysomoides fulvus lays eggs on the larvae of Polistes apachus. This especially affects new nests with only one foundress, as the queen must therefore leave the nest to find food. This leaves the nest especially vulnerable. The nests of this wasp are invaded by the parasitoid caterpillars of the moth Chalcoela iphitalis which feed on the wasp larvae and pupas at night, spinning their cocoons in empty cells. Other known parasites of this species are the strange fly-like creature Xenos peckii, an entomophagous endoparasite, and an unknown species of Sarcophaga fly.

== Human Impact ==
=== Pests ===
Polistes apachus can sting painfully and repeatedly, and scares children and adults. Exterminators are sometimes called in to eliminate nests. It has established itself in some areas of California as the main Polistes species in urban areas. It often builds its nests under the eaves of buildings. It may also nest in orchards and vineyards. It has been a problem for workers in fig orchards who have often been stung. A number of chemical pest control methods have been tested for P. apachus. Most commercially available aerosol sprays containing pyrethrins are effective at knocking the wasps down to the ground. Dusting nests with 10% DDT has been shown to successfully eliminate them. On the other hand, poisoned baits using beef liver and honey have proven to be unsuccessful. One former pest control professional has recommended using a jet of high pressure water to spray them off of eaves, doing this early in the morning while the wasps are less active, quickly crushing any wet and stunned wasps which fall into the garden, and doing this in the spring before the nests become too big.

With that being said, in some cases some Polistes species may be beneficial to farmers due to their hunting of caterpillars.

=== Stings ===
As outdoor activity has increased, so too has the nuisance of P. apachus. Its stings can lead to serious allergic reactions in humans and cats. Recent studies have used venom specific detection to determine that P. apachus stings have led to anaphylaxis. Venom immunotherapy (VIT) can sometimes be used to treat allergies to insect stings, specifically in individuals who experience systematic reactions to insect stings. Though the safety of VIT with the honeybee has been questioned, VIT appears to safe for P. apachus venom.

== Conservation ==
The IUCN has not evaluated this species' conservation status.

It has been recorded as present in the following protected areas:

- Brantley Lake State Park (when it was still Lake McMillan), New Mexico, US.
- Cibola National Forest, New Mexico, US.
- Coronado Historic Site, New Mexico, US.
- Hornsby Bend Bird Observatory, Austin, Texas, US.
- Kevin Gottshall Memorial Park, Oklahoma, US.
- Laguna Grande Restoration Area (just north of the Colorado River Delta), Mexicali, Baja California, Mexico.
- Monahans Sandhills State Park, Texas, US.
- Petroglyph National Monument, New Mexico, US.
- Prescott National Forest, Arizona, US.
- Tonto National Forest, Arizona, US.
- White Rocks Nature Preserve, Colorado, US.
- Zion National Park, Utah, US.
