= El Cabichuí =

Paraguayan trench newspaper

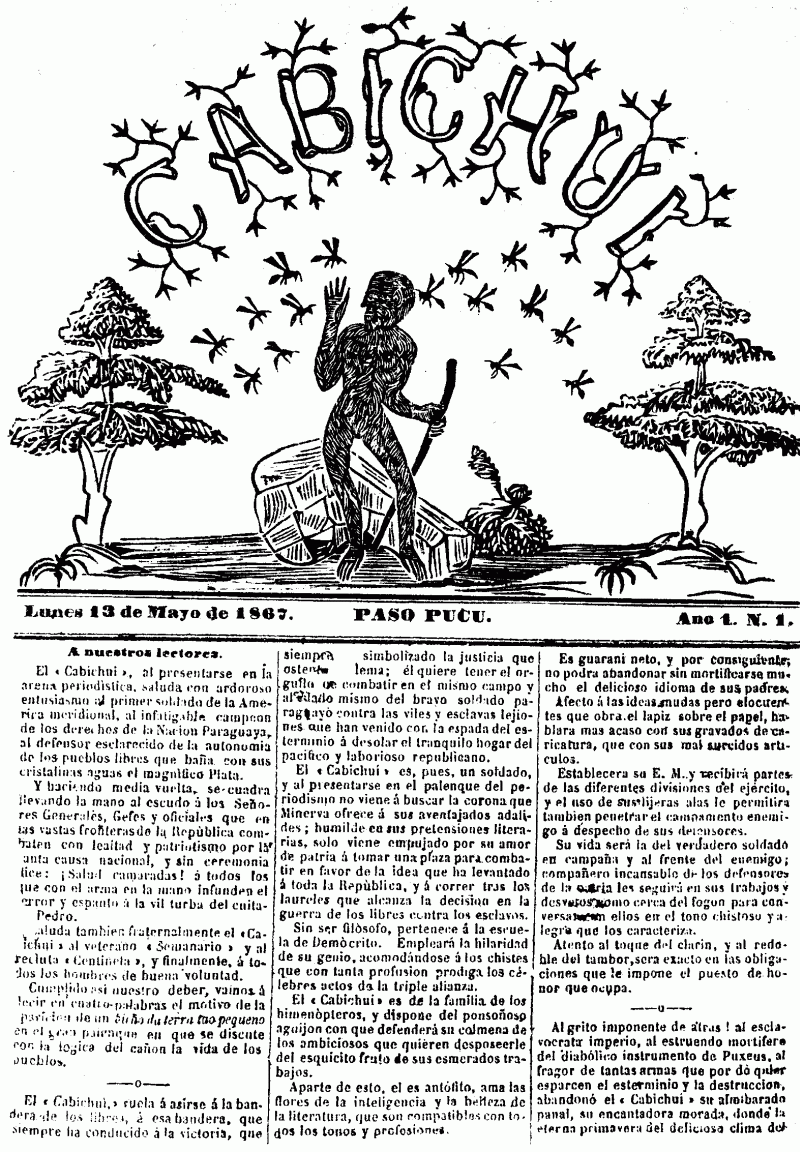
- Masthead of the Cabichuí; A cloud of cabichuís (local venomous wasps) assails an Afro-Brazilian
- Type: Newspaper
- Founded: May 13, 1867
- Ceased publication: August 20, 1868
- Political alignment: Paraguayan nationalism
- Country: Paraguay

El Cabichuí was an early biweekly Paraguayan governmental trench newspaper, written and printed near the front during the Siege of Humaitá in the Paraguayan War, aimed at being read by the Paraguayan Army soldiery. Directed by Juan Crisóstomo Centurión and Natalicio Talavera, it had text both in Guarani and Spanish. A bare month after Humaitá fell, it stopped being printed, as the war once again became mobile; by that point, it had run for 95 issues. (Note: This is disputed: the National Library of Paraguay claims it ran for 95 issues, but Luc Capdevila claims it only ran for 87.)

== History ==
El Cabichuí was a very early example of a trench newspaper, born in a context where battle lines had been stagnant for more than a year during the Siege of Humaitá in the Paraguayan War. It was idealized by the Paraguayan president, Francisco Solano López, as a tool for improving morale. It was made via woodcut with a rustic press in López's headquarters (initially at Paso Pucú, and later at San Fernando, in today's Central Department), and printed on caraguata fibers.

The name Cabichuí refers to a species of black wasp common in Paraguay (probably the Polybia occidentalis) which was known for its painful sting. In each issue of the paper there was a caricature where a swarm of these wasps stung a black soldier; the racial composition of the Brazilian Army was a major news theme, with Emperor Pedro II and the Brazilian soldiers frequently depicted as monkeys by the Cabichuí and other Paraguayan official media. The other allied nations also were similarly targeted, with Uruguayan leader Venancio Flores being called "Pedro II's little dog", and, together with Argentine leader Bartolomé Mitre, "vampires, who rose from cover in the shadowy night sucking the blood of their brothers and friends", who wanted to leave the war.

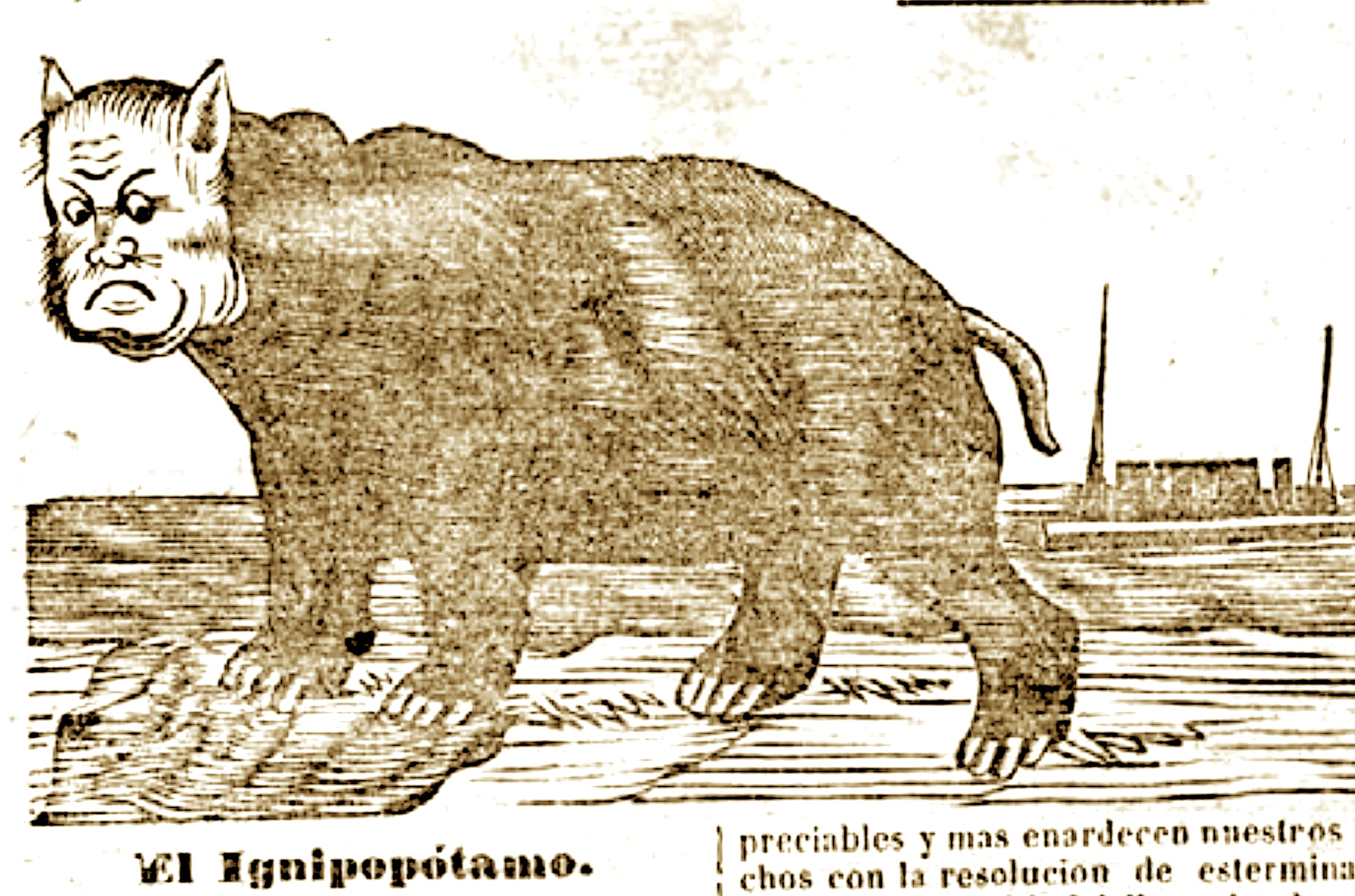
The ignorant hippopotamus. Admiral Joaquim José Inácio caricatured in El Cabichuí, 24 February 1868. The Passage of Humaitá, which had happened five days earlier, went unmentioned.

Directed by the foreign-educated Juan Crisóstomo Centurión, it had contributions from other intellectuals such as the priests Fidel Maíz and Geronimo Becchi. Despite this, its tone was mocking and heavy-handed, as it was aimed to be read by the soldiers of the army; due to this intent, it had text both in Guarani and Spanish, and sometimes even in Portuguese, because some copies were snuck into the allied encampment by spies. The British engineer George Thompson, who was serving with the Paraguayan forces at the time, described the paper's jokes as "rude" and "stupid".

At least one member of its editorial corps was killed at the 1868 San Fernando massacre.

== Editorial ==
El Cabichuí interpreted the Triple Alliance War as a struggle for liberty, taking the Brazilian Empire as Paraguay's great enemy, a slave-holding empire against a republic. It painted battles which were inconclusive or even defeats as great Paraguayan victories, and once claimed Mitre, the Argentine president and general, had died at the front (incorrectly, for it had been the Argentine vice-president who'd died).

Most of what was published by the paper was reviewed by Solano López himself before it was put out.
