= Protopolybia chartergoides =

Scientific classification
- Kingdom: Animalia
- Phylum: Arthropoda
- Class: Insecta
- Order: Hymenoptera
- Family: Vespidae
- Subfamily: Polistinae
- Genus: Protopolybia
- Species: P. chartergoides

Binomial name
- Protopolybia chartergoides (Gribodo, 1891)

Species of wasp

Protopolybia chartergoides, also known as Pseudochartergus chartergoides, is a species of wasp within the genus Protopolybia. It is a social wasp found in southern Central America and northern South America.

== Taxonomy and phylogeny ==
The genus Protopolybia belongs to the wasp family Vespidae. Wasps belong to the order Hymenoptera, making them relatives of ants, bees, and sawflies. P. chartergoides is one of thirty species within Protopolybia. It has three identified subspecies: P. chartergoides boshelli, P. chartergoides cinctella, and P. chartergoides isthmensis.

== Description ==
Protopolybia chartergoides has two distinguishing characteristics—their nests have transparent envelopes made from oral secretion and females are docile, which contrasts with the aggressiveness seen in most social wasps. Nests of P. chartergoides have envelopes that consist predominantly of chitin that is secreted orally. Social wasps often use oral secretions such as chitin or protein to glue plant material, repel rain, and contribute to a nest's mechanical strength.

== Distribution and habitat ==
Protopolybia chartergoides is distributed in northwest South America to southern Brazil and have also been spotted in some southern parts of southern Central America as well. P. chartergoides is a relatively rare wasp species.

== Colony cycle ==
Studies in regard to the colony cycle of P. chartergoides are not extensive, but the species is known to have comparatively small colonies that reach to only a few hundred. Generally for social wasps, a queen that was fertilized the previous year and who has survived the winter starts a new colony each spring. The queen builds a small nest and raises a starter brood of female workers that then take over nest expansion, building cells into which the queen continues to lay eggs in. These social wasp colonies usually die off in the winter, and a newly fertilized queen that survives the cold of the winter restarts the process in spring.

== Division of labor ==
In social wasps, like P. chartergoides, the division of labor between castes (and the division of labor in workers dependent upon age) is critical for the maintenance of social organization. There is a clear difference between queens and workers. The queen caste is characterized by behaviors of physical dominance and food solicitation. On the other hand, adult behavior in the worker caste included— trophallaxis, cell destruction, alarm, and foraging. The worker caste can then be divided into two groups: intra-nest activities that younger workers tend to and extra-nest activities, such as foraging, that older workers take on.

== Caste differentiation in females ==
Caste of P. chartergoides females can be determined by examining the ovaries and the spermatheca for insemination. Queens are inseminated females with developed ovaries, intermediates are unmated females with some development of the ovaries, and workers are unmated females with no development of the ovaries. Intermediate females are morphologically similar to worker females. Caste differentiation is very similar in the species Polybia sericea.

== Camouflage ==
It has been observed that Protopolybia chartergoides nests are transparent and the envelope is made of a salivary matrix restricts access to the cavity. The combs are brown and visible beyond the transparent envelope.

== Interaction with other species ==
=== Diet ===
Social wasps, such as P. chartergoides, are generally carnivores, preying mostly on insects, such as caterpillars and flies. The wasps digest their victims' bodies into a paste that can be fed to their larvae. The larvae then produce nutritional syrup that the adults consume.

=== Predators ===
Common insects that prey on wasps include praying mantises, dragonflies, centipedes, beetles and moths. In fact, large wasps will even prey on smaller wasps. Spiders will also capture wasps in their webs and eat them. Predatory reptiles and amphibians, such as frogs, lizards, toads, and salamanders see the wasp as just another opportunistic meal and do not differentiate them from other insects, despite their feared sting. Birds that regularly consume bugs will also eat wasps. Other creatures that eat wasps, particularly mammals, are more interested in the larvae rather than the adults.

=== Defense ===
When a social wasp is in distress, it emits a pheromone that triggers nearby colony members into defensive mode, a greatly increased willingness and desire to sting. Wasps can sting repeatedly unlike their close relative, the bee. Stingers, which are actually modified egg-laying organs, are only found in females.

== Agriculture ==
Despite common fears, wasps are actually beneficial to humans because wasps prey on many pest insects, either for food or as a host for its parasitic larvae. Wasps are adroit at controlling pest populations, so much so that recently the agriculture industry has started to regularly use them to protect crops.
