= Polybia dimidiata =

Scientific classification
- Kingdom: Animalia
- Phylum: Arthropoda
- Class: Insecta
- Order: Hymenoptera
- Family: Vespidae
- Genus: Polybia
- Subgenus: Cylindroeca
- Species: P. dimidiata

Binomial name
- Polybia dimidiata (Olivier, 1791)

Species of wasp

Polybia dimidiata, also known as the tapiucaba or lamborina in Brazil, is a species of eusocial wasp found in South America.
