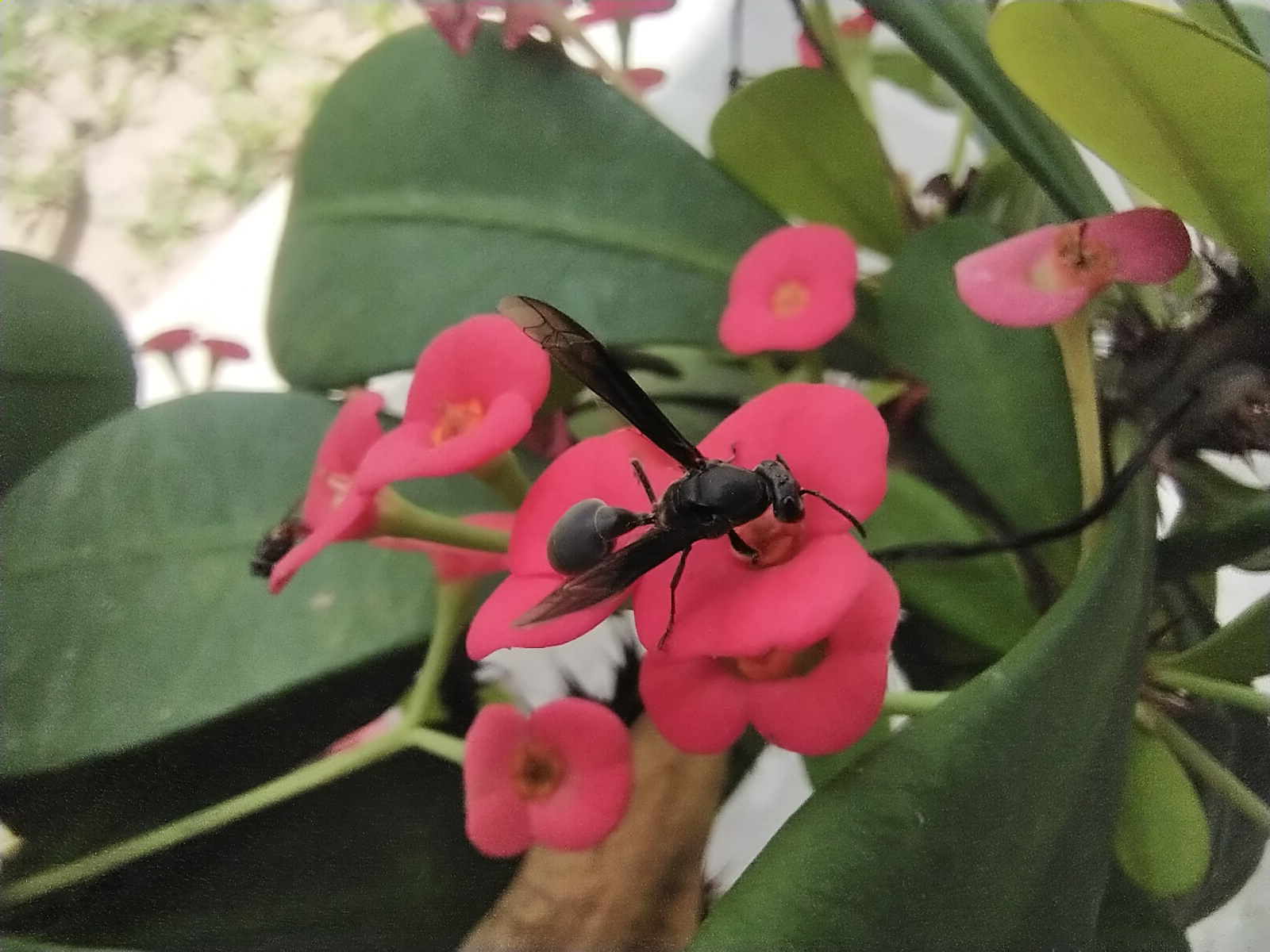

Scientific classification
- Kingdom: Animalia
- Phylum: Arthropoda
- Class: Insecta
- Order: Hymenoptera
- Family: Vespidae
- Genus: Polybia
- Subgenus: Trichinothorax
- Species: P. ignobilis

Binomial name
- Polybia ignobilis (Haliday, 1836)

Synonyms
- Polistes ignobilis Haliday, 1836; Polybia atra de Saussure, 1854; Polybia nigra de Saussure; Polybia socialis de Saussure, 1854

= Polybia ignobilis =

Species of wasp

Polybia ignobilis is a species of wasp in the Vespidae family. It is a medium-sized wasp, completely black, except for the back of the wings, which is lighter than the front. It forms numerous colonies in cavities inside tree trunks, house foundations, stone fences, etc. It is found in South America.

It sometimes pollinates the flower Distimake aegyptius.
