= Polybia sericea =

Scientific classification
- Kingdom: Animalia
- Phylum: Arthropoda
- Clade: Pancrustacea
- Class: Insecta
- Order: Hymenoptera
- Family: Vespidae
- Genus: Polybia
- Subgenus: Trichinothorax
- Species: P. sericea

Binomial name
- Polybia sericea (Olivier, 1792)

Species of wasp

Polybia sericea is a social, tropical wasp of the family Vespidae that can be found in South America. It founds its colonies by swarming migrations, and feeds on nectar and arthropods.

P. sericea is medium in size, and has a dark-colored body. The wasps build multitiered nests, and colony size can vary greatly between a few to a few thousand workers. Queens can be distinguished from workers by their greater body size and smaller head size. They tend to be polygynous, meaning that several egg-laying queens are within a nest, with the result that workers are generally less related to each other than in other eusocial species. Workers are responsible for hunting and foraging, while queens are responsible for laying eggs, and have the most developed ovaries. When hunting for prey, workers rely heavily on visual and olfactory cues. Prey include arthropods such as green and brown caterpillars.

== Taxonomy and phylogeny ==
P. sericea is a species within the genus Polybia of the subfamily Polistinae. Polybia is the most diversified genus within tribe Epiponini, which is characterized by colony founding via swarming. Placement of Polybia among related genera has fluctuated, and the genus may be paraphyletic.

== Description and identification ==
P. sericea individuals are medium-sized wasps, about 17 mm long. They are dark in color, and tend to be slow-flying and docile, unless they are disturbed. Queens typically have larger abdomens, and smaller heads and wings than workers.

Workers build enclosed, multitiered, roughly spherical nests of carton paper maché-like pulp of plant fibres chewed with saliva. Nests are reddish-brown in color, and are not very large. They are typically built between 2 and 5 m off the ground, in the branches of trees or shrubs.

P. sericea nest

== Distribution and habitat ==
Individuals of P. sericea live in South America, and are commonly found throughout Brazil. A large population inhabits the lower tropical Amazon region of Brazil. They tend to live in semiarid climates, in open areas, around forest edges, and near rivers. This species prefers to live in areas with grasses, trees, and shrubs, likely because these areas make good places to build nests and to forage.

== Colony cycle ==
P. sericea colonies can range from a few to a few thousand individuals, but are typically made up of several hundred workers. The number of queens in a nest can range from one to several. New colonies are founded by swarming emigration, where the entire colony travels to a new nest site.

== Behavior ==
=== Swarm emigration ===
Swarm emigration may occur for several reasons. One is if the colony sends a reproductive swarm from the original nest. This may happen if the colony has grown too big, and must split into two new colonies. In this situation, part of the colony remains in the original nest, with a subgroup leaving to colonize a new nesting site. Other reasons it occurs is if an old nest becomes unsuitable, or if the nest is attacked by a predator. At first, when the colony is driven from the nest, individuals assemble in groups of 2 or 3 around the original nest. Wasps will exchange between groups until the entire colony is assembled in one cluster. The colony may remain in this cluster for up to 2 days before migrating to the new site. Once the colony begins to travel, leading individuals drag their gasters over prominent objects such as branches or tall grass. This releases a pheromone that other workers can follow to the new nesting site.

=== Pheromone communication ===
Pheromone communication can be used to recruit workers to a food source, a new nesting site, or a place where work is required. The pheromone is released from the abdomen of the wasp, at the base of the fifth sternite. It is excreted by Richard's glands. The pheromone has a strong, leather-like odor, and looks like brownish wax. Because of the strong odor, workers can easily follow a pheromone trail left by other colony members. The pheromone is produced slowly and continuously throughout life, so it can be used up if used too often or too quickly. Another species that exhibits this behavior is Synoeca surinama.

=== Foraging ===
P. sericea individuals forage for flower nectar, nest-building materials, and for prey. Workers tend to search for building materials such as wood pulp in the mid-morning, and for food in the later morning and early afternoon. Workers generally forage close to the nest because they cannot fly long distances. These wasps can fly for about 75 m, which is low compared to other species in the genus Polybia. When searching over longer distances, return rate to the nest decreases. When availability of food resources is low, colony development becomes limited. P. sericea can store nectar as honey to use in times of scarcity.

=== Hunting ===
When workers hunt for arthropods, they fly from side to side about half a meter off of the ground. Visual cues are used to determine where to search for prey, whereas olfactory cues are used to determine nearby prey, and elicit landing. Green and brown caterpillars are the most common prey for P. sericea. Once a caterpillar or other insect has been found, workers bite the insect behind the head. They then drag the prey up onto a twig or a piece of grass, or sometimes fly the insect to a different location, to keep ants or other insects from stealing their prey. Once the insect is in a safe location, the wasp malaxates (softens) it by mixing it with a thinner substance, presumably saliva. The worker then brings what it can back to the nest to feed others. If prey is too large to bring back to the nest, foragers leave the prey, and fly in side-to-side arcs back to the nest to recruit other workers to help carry the load.

== Kin selection ==
=== Genetic relatedness ===
Colonies of P. sericea are polygynous, and generally have more than one queen. Typically, the number of queens in a colony is three or four. This results in a lower degree of relatedness among workers, and why workers should care for offspring that are related to them by less than half is questioned. Although this is not fully understood, the advantages of group living may compensate for the low degree of relatedness among workers, so workers will still care for offspring.

=== Caste differentiation ===
Some morphological differences are seen between queens and workers of P. sericea. Generally, queens are larger than workers in the abdominal region, but have smaller head width and wing length. Queens are the only ones with well-developed ovarioles, mature oocytes, and sperm-filled spermathecae. Workers' ovaries are either underdeveloped or not developed at all, so they are not reproductive. Queens perform the reproductive tasks of the colony, while workers forage for food and nest-building materials. Thus, workers likely have larger brains and wings because they must hunt and forage for food. The morphological differences seen in this caste differentiation are also seen with the species Protopolybia chartergoides and Polybia rejecta.

== Interaction with other species ==
=== Nest defense ===
P. sericea wasps are generally docile, and do not attack other organisms unless they are stimulated. When they are attacked, however, they may chase predators up to 15 m away from the nest. In addition, they may sting and bite the predator. The magnitude of a defense response is proportional to the energetic investment by the colony in rearing individuals and to the size of the colony. More individuals are likely to attack a predator if more adults, eggs, larvae, and pupae are in the nest, since the colony has already made a large investment in developing itself. P. sericea relies upon active defense to defend their nests from ants, whereas other species produce glandular secretions that act as ant repellant to deter their entering the nest.

=== Diet ===
The diet of P. sericea consists of arthropods such as caterpillars and flies, as well as energetic carbohydrates such as nectar and fruits. Larvae feed only on animal proteins that must be supplied by adult workers. The workers must hunt for insects and feed them to larvae by chewing up the prey and transferring it to the larvae. The most common natural prey of this species is green or brown caterpillars. They also may prey on cashew fruits in Brazil, as well as the white fly, which parasitizes the cashew fruit.

== Cultural significance ==
P. sericea is historically and culturally significant to the Pankararé Indians, who live in northwest Brazil. They have developed a folk taxonomy of many social bees and wasps that inhabit the area. P. sericea is classified as a fierce wasp that is likely to bite more than once. This classification contrasts with other findings that describe this species as docile, and not aggressive unless provoked. The Pankararé often roast the combs of P. sericea larvae, and then extract them to be eaten alone or mixed with manioc flour. In addition, they use this species in their healing practices. A bath of smoke from burning the nests is used to treat evil eye and stroke.
