= Azteca andreae =

Scientific classification
- Kingdom: Animalia
- Phylum: Arthropoda
- Class: Insecta
- Order: Hymenoptera
- Family: Formicidae
- Subfamily: Dolichoderinae
- Genus: Azteca
- Species: A. andreae

Binomial name
- Azteca andreae Guerrero, Delabie & Dejean, 2010

Species of ant

Azteca andreae is an arboreal ant species found in the tropics of South America, most notably in French Guiana. They are most notable for their predatory skills and strength. They are ambush predators that are able to capture and eat other insects much greater than their own size.

== Physical characteristics ==
Azteca andreae have dark brown, shiny bodies covered in white hair. The workers are a little less than 3mm in length, and the queen is slightly more than 5mm in length.

== Habitat ==
The ants live in the hollow internodes, or the spaces in between nodes on the plant stem, of select plant species. When the queens start a new colony, they apparently limit their colonies to Cecropia trees. They will inhabit multiple different species of tree, but they have a preference for Cecropia obtusa. Up to 8350 workers live in each tree. The queens initially start the colonies inside of the tree, but the ants will eventually build external carton nests. The ants will also build their nests near the wasp species Polybia rejecta in order to protect the nests from other predators. The wasp is highly aggressive towards any mammal or other predator that approaches their nest.

== Plant-ant symbiosis ==
Often, the ants will not only receive housing from the plant; they will eat extrafloral nectar and food bodies that the plant provides. In return, the plant receives security from herbivores that may eat the plant, because the ants hunt on the plant and eat many of the plant’s predators. This symbiosis benefits both the plant and ants.

== Predatory behavior ==
Azteca andreae use ambush predation to hunt insects many times their own size. The ants will actually position themselves side-by-side next to each other underneath the edge a leaf. There, they are invisible from above except for their mandibles, which hang outside the edge waiting for prey. Many times, the ants will occupy each leaf of the plant.

When an insect lands on the leaf, three to ten of the closest ants immediately attack and drive the prey to the leaf margin, where more ambushing ants will congregate and attack. Large prey is only captured if on the edge of the leaf, because the ants use their specialized legs to hold onto the velvety surface underneath ‘’Cecropia obtusa’’ leaves. This mechanism essentially acts like Velcro, with the many small hooks on the legs of the ant gripping onto the velvet of the underside of the leaf. Because only the bottom of the leaf has this surface, the ants can only really capture prey when they are holding onto the leaf from the underside. This is the main factor that allows the ants to capture such massive prey. After catching their prey, they will either start tearing it to shreds on the spot or take it back to the colony and cut it up into smaller pieces.

In an experiment by Alain Dejean et al. (2010), the ants captured more prey when hunting on Cecropia obtusa than any other plant. The proposed explanation for this was the enhanced gripping power resulting from the Velcro-like mechanism that was absent on all the other plants. In addition, the research team tested the limits of the ants’ strength. They placed a weight on a thread, which they introduced to an ant that immediately grabbed on to the thread with its mandibles. An individual ant held onto weights up to eight grams, or 5,714 times the ant’s weight. Collectively, they were observed to capture a locust that weighed 18.61 grams, or 13,350 times the average weight of a single worker. This is one of the largest feats of strength documented in the entire animal world.
