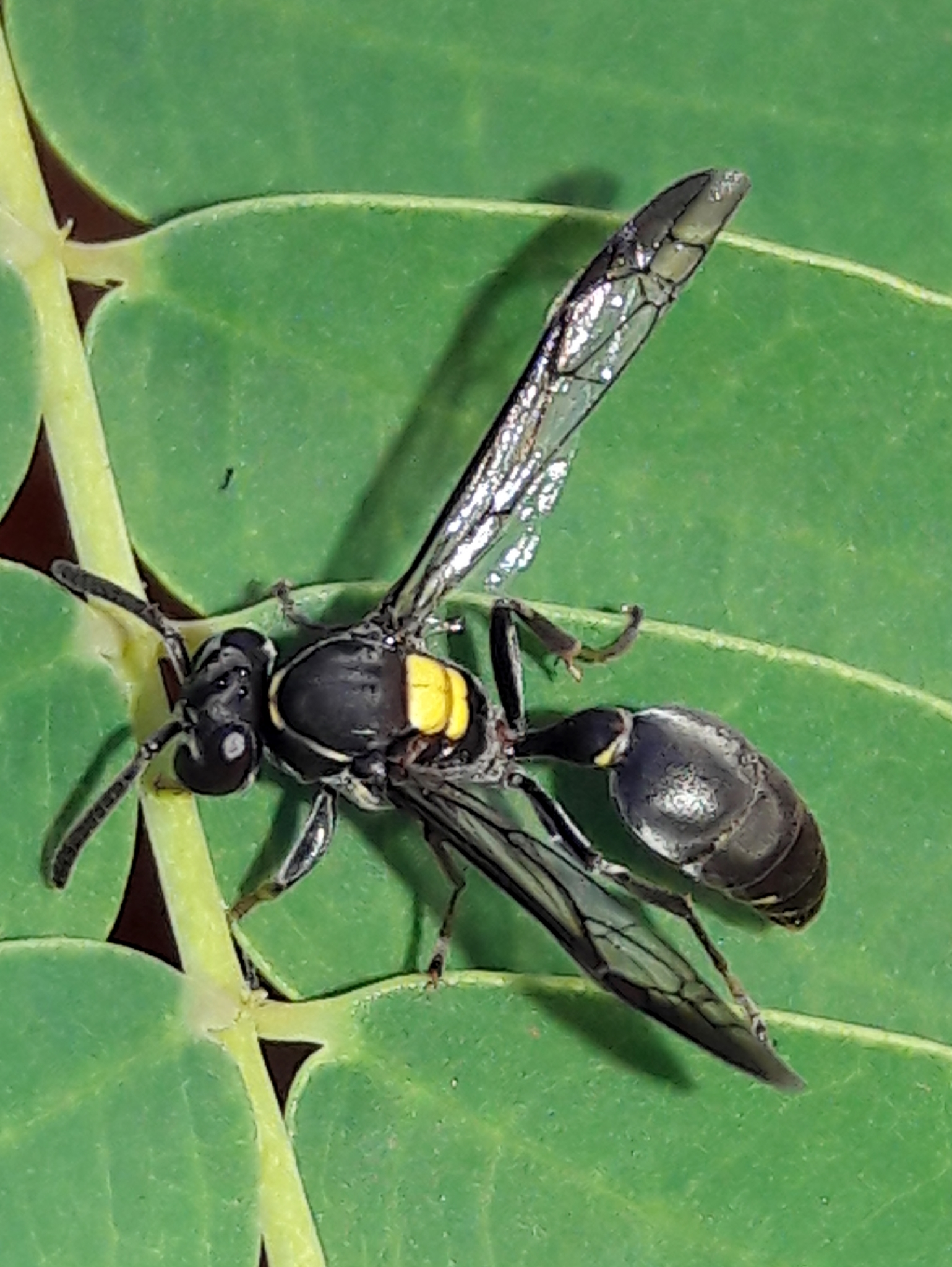

Scientific classification
- Kingdom: Animalia
- Phylum: Arthropoda
- Clade: Pancrustacea
- Class: Insecta
- Order: Hymenoptera
- Family: Vespidae
- Genus: Polybia
- Subgenus: Myrapetra
- Species: P. paulista

Binomial name
- Polybia paulista Ihering 1896

= Polybia paulista =

Species of wasp

Polybia paulista is a species of eusocial wasp occurring in Brazil, Paraguay, and Argentina.

The venom of P. paulista contains a peptide with potential use as a chemotherapeutic substance named Polybia-MP1. This peptide kills cancerous cells while leaving healthy cells intact.

== Habitat ==
Polybia paulista are found in tropical areas of Argentina, Paraguay and are prevalent in Brazil, specifically São Paulo. Nesting and colonization tends to occur in areas where they have protection from weathering. There can be up to three colonies in the same location, and swarms are present periodically. Initial development of the nest begins with swarming or absconding in which the first comb is used to fix the nest to a substrate. The first comb does have the development of envelopes but no eggs are found, due to the low survival rate. During this period there is a large percentage of the colony on the exterior of the nest due to the lack of available space inside the nest. This creates a tight cluster of wasps around the nest, which limits access of the nest to predators, such as ants. The swarm on the exterior of the nest is no longer present around the 10 day period. This time can fluctuate depending on the season, warmer temperatures allow faster work rate of wasps causing quicker construction of the nest.

There is a pause in nest construction to allow for larval emergence, this is to allocate resources towards the larval development. Once the larva emerge, a final comb is built around 12 days; with a final comb count of 5–6. A colony size range throughout the development of the nest, specifically during the energizing phase there is about 4500 wasps and up to 13,000 wasps during production of males. Queen numbers also range throughout colony development, because P. paulista are polygenic, there is a constant recruitment of young queens. Therefore, numbers from 10 to 94 queens have been found in nest throughout the colony cycle.

== Social behaviours ==
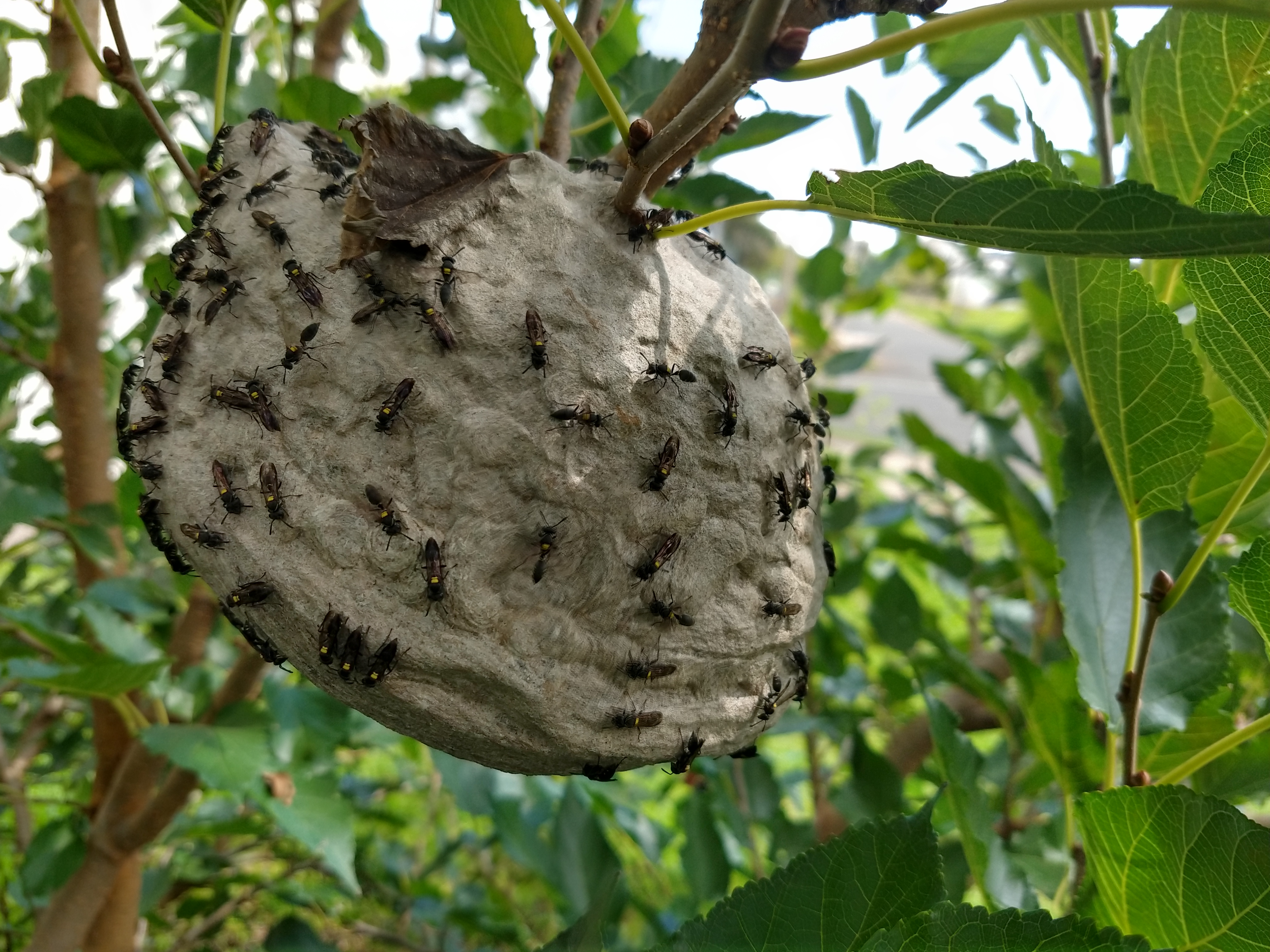
P. paulista nest

Polybia paulista are swarm-founding wasps which are highly social societies that are complex. The diverse organization of social structure creates different partitioning locations, collecting and transporting or storing resources. In colonies there is a division of labour which is based on age and caste differentiation; young castes have low risk in nest duties, mirage caste are involved in external nest activities such as construction and defensive against predators or parasites and older castes do high-risk duties, such as foraging. Designated workers in the colony have the tasks of nest building, foraging, brood feeding and defence of the colony.

=== Foraging ===
Foraging is an essential part of the colonies survival as it allows for growth of the colony and ecological relationship between the colony and the ecosystem. The main influence of foraging is temperature, where the increase in temperature sees the increase in foraging. This is typically due to increase water requirements for cooling the nest if workers are unable to cool nest through the fanning of their wings. The water is then spread on combs and envelopes which allows the decrease in nest temperature through evaporation. It is observed that foraging takes place during a specific range of temperature, from 19.5 °C to 32 °C. Temperature also regulates foraging through flight, wasps cannot fly until a distinct thoracic temperature is reached. This can be done through environmental factors or from workers flexing flight muscles to increase thoracic temperature. Humidity and light intensity have mixed results of impacts on foraging but seem to correlate with temperature.

There are four important items that P. paulista preferentially forage after. The first is water, which is collected throughout the year and used for temperature control, nest construction and metabolic processes. Plant fibre or pulp is also foraged, and typically is collected through the months of August to September and December to January. Macerated wood fibre made into a pulp is used for repair of cells and envelopes, as well as nest construction. Animal protein is also collected year round and is used for feeding larva. The demand of animal protein is dependent on the number of immatures in the colony and the cycle the colony is currently in. Finally carbohydrates are forged year round for energy and is important in the diets of adult wasps. Wasps seem to feed primarily on cactus fruits, and focus on the cacti species which are in abundance and easily available during that time of year.

=== Reproduction ===
In a swarm-founding paper wasp colony there are multiple queens depending on colony cycle and progression. Young queens tend to be morphologically similar to those of workers but some distinction can be found in older queens, generally with physically size. Queens have a life span of up to 1 year while workers life cycle last 30 days, with the first day of flight is around the 6th day. Queen dominance is attributed by social dominance, which is believed to be a behaviour and to shift colony from poling to monogyny. As well as queen physical size, where it is observed that younger queens replace older queens base on the development in size.

The queens have the ability to store sperm in the spermatheca, and use it when her eggs need to be fertilized. Envelopes are created over combs to protect brood cells during oviposition. The development of envelopes helps regulate a common concern with the loss of water in eggs, which causes the embyrosgenesis to become dormant. Eggs develop into workers throughout the year and takes place in intermediate periods.

Polybia paulista have 5 larval instars and allows the growth and development of multiple morphological features. Head size typically increases with instars but amount of growth is dependent on biotic an abiotic influences. With each instar there is an increase of body weight, salivary glands and mandibular gland, and development was associated with social relationships and task performed in the colony. Specifically lateral tooth in mandibles develop in the fourth instar, opening the body spiracles in the second instar, and presence of spines in the maxilla after the fifth instar.

== Defence ==
Polybia paulista venom has been currently a focus of study because of its potential ability to be used as a chemotherapeutic substance. Currently there are 6 major peptides identified which represent 3% of the 70% of the composition of venom. The 6 peptides are mastoparnas polybia MP-I and -II which induce mast cell degranulation, Polybines-I and -II that are N-terminal acetylated peptides that are involved in inflammatory actions, Polybia-CP which is a chemotactic peptide for polymorphonucleated leukocytes and peptides at disulphide bridges which promote insulin secretion from beta cells.

Wasps use venom to cause mnemonic actions in stung victims by inflammatory response to toxins and cause physical discomfort. The toxins are produced by peptides that have multiple actions, such as pain oedema formation, hemolysis, chemotaxis of PMLs and most cell degranulation. The variety of peptide composition for venom in intra and inter nest individuals, creates different potencies and toxicity. Allowing wasps to defend themselves against a vast number of predators.

The low molecular weight compounds of wasps venom cause anticonvulsant and anxiolytic effects on bioassays; which could be a used to help treat epilepsy. Polybia MP-I have been suggested to be a novel therapeutic strategy in the treatment of prostate cancer and bladder cancer, due to its relatively lower cytotoxicity to unaffected cells.

Research has also shown that the venom of P. paulista contains an antimicrobial agent, Mastoparan, that inhibits all developmental forms of Trypanosoma cruzi, the parasite that is responsible for Chagas disease.

=== Chemotherapeutic potential of Polybia-MP1 ===
Polybia paulista features a peptide Polybia-MP1 that causes increased permeability in cells featuring phospholipids phosphatidylserine (PS) and phosphatidylethanolamine (PE) on the outer membrane. As cancer cells feature the PS and PE phospholipids on the outside of the cell membrane, unlike with non-cancerous cells where they usually remain on the inside of the cell membrane, they are susceptible to the peptide which causes increased cell permeability to a degree that molecules critical for cell function may leak out.

Further research is needed to ensure that Polybia-MP1 is safe for use as a chemotherapeutic drug.

=== Parasitism ===
Polybia paulista are infected by the parasites strepsipteran and an un-described gregarine. Both these parasites infer the hemocoel in the master of adults. Strepsipteran manipulates the overall body size of workers, and cause workers to depart from the nest after emergence as adults. Gregarine found to cause workers to have larger body size, but was concluded that these parasites prefer larger worker body size and prolong development in larvae which allows them to grow larger.
