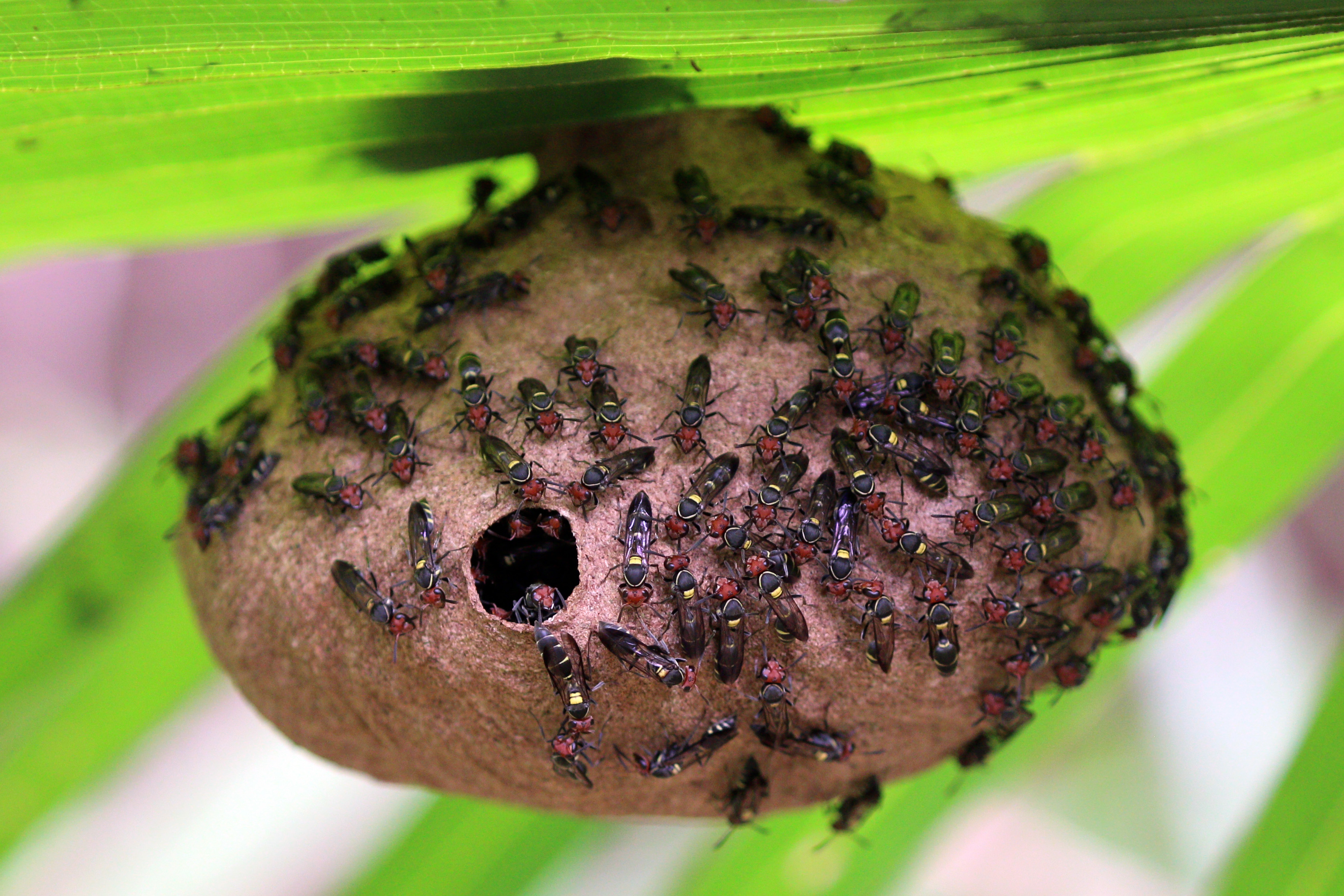
- P. ruficeps in the Pantanal, Brazil

Scientific classification
- Kingdom: Animalia
- Phylum: Arthropoda
- Clade: Pancrustacea
- Class: Insecta
- Order: Hymenoptera
- Family: Vespidae
- Tribe: Epiponini
- Genus: Polybia; Lepeletier, 1836

Type species
- Polistes liliacea Fabricius, 1804

Species
- See text

= Polybia =

Genus of wasps

Polybia is a genus of eusocial wasps ranging from Central to South America (Mexico to Brazil, Argentina). Some produce enough honey to be collected and eaten by local people.

== Species ==
There are 59 extant species of Polybia divided into 11 subgenera.

=== Polybia (Alpha) de Saussure, 1854 ===
- Polybia bifasciata Saussure, 1854
- Polybia signata Ducke, 1910
- Polybia quadricincta Saussure, 1854

=== Polybia (Apopolybia) Richards, 1978 ===
- Polybia jurinei Saussure, 1854
- Polybia simillima Smith, 1862

=== Polybia (Cylindroeca) Richards, 1978 ===
- Polybia dimidiata (Olivier, 1791)

=== Polybia (Formicicola) Richards, 1978 ===
- Polybia rejecta (Fabricius, 1798)

=== Polybia (Furnariana) Richards, 1978 ===
- Polybia furnaria Ihering, 1904
- Polybia richardsi Cooper, 1993

=== Polybia (Myrapetra) White, 1841 ===
- Polybia aequatorialis Zavattari, 1906
- Polybia barbouri Bequard, 1943
- Polybia belemensis Richards, 1970
- Polybia bicyttarella Richards, 1951
- Polybia bistriata (Fabricius, 1804)
- Polybia catillifex Moebius, 1856
- Polybia dimorpha Richards, 1978
- Polybia divisoria Richards, 1978
- Polybia erythrothorax Richards, 1978
- Polybia fastidiosuscula Saussure, 1854
- Polybia ficaria Richards, 1978
- Polybia flavifrons Smith, 1857
- Polybia juruana Ihering, 1904
- Polybia nidulatrix Bequard, 1933
- Polybia occidentalis (Olivier, 1791)
- Polybia parvulina Richards, 1970
- Polybia paulista Ihering, 1896
- Polybia platycephala Richards, 1951
- Polybia plebeja Saussure, 1867
- Polybia roraimae Raw, 2000
- Polybia ruficeps Schrottky, 1902
- Polybia scrobalis Richards, 1970
- Polybia scutellaris (White, 1841)
- Polybia selvana Carpenter, 2002

=== Polybia (Pedothoeca) Richards, 1978 ===
- Polybia brunnea (Curtis, 1844)
- Polybia emaciata Lucas, 1879
- Polybia singularis Ducke, 1909
- Polybia spinifex Richards, 1978

=== Polybia (Platypolybia) Richards, 1978 ===
- Polybia incerta Ducke, 1907
- Polybia procellosa Zavattari, 1906

=== Polybia (Polybia) Lepeletier, 1836 ===
- Polybia liliacea (Fabricius, 1804)
- Polybia striata (Fabricius, 1787)

=== Polybia (Synoecoides) Ducke, 1905 ===
- Polybia depressa (Ducke, 1905)

=== Polybia (Trichinothorax) Carpenter & Day, 1988 ===
- Polybia affinis Buysson, 1908
- Polybia batesi Richards, 1978
- Polybia chrysothorax (Lichtenstein)
- Polybia eberhardae Cooper, 1993
- Polybia flavitincta Fox, 1898
- Polybia gorytoides Fox, 1898
- Polybia ignobilis (Haliday, 1836)
- Polybia lugubris Saussure, 1854
- Polybia micans Ducke, 1904
- Polybia minarum Ducke, 1906
- Polybia nigrina Richards, 1978
- Polybia punctata Buysson, 1908
- Polybia raui Bequard, 1933
- Polybia rufitarsis Ducke, 1904
- Polybia sericea (Olivier, 1792)
- Polybia tinctipennis Fox, 1898
- Polybia velutina Ducke, 1907
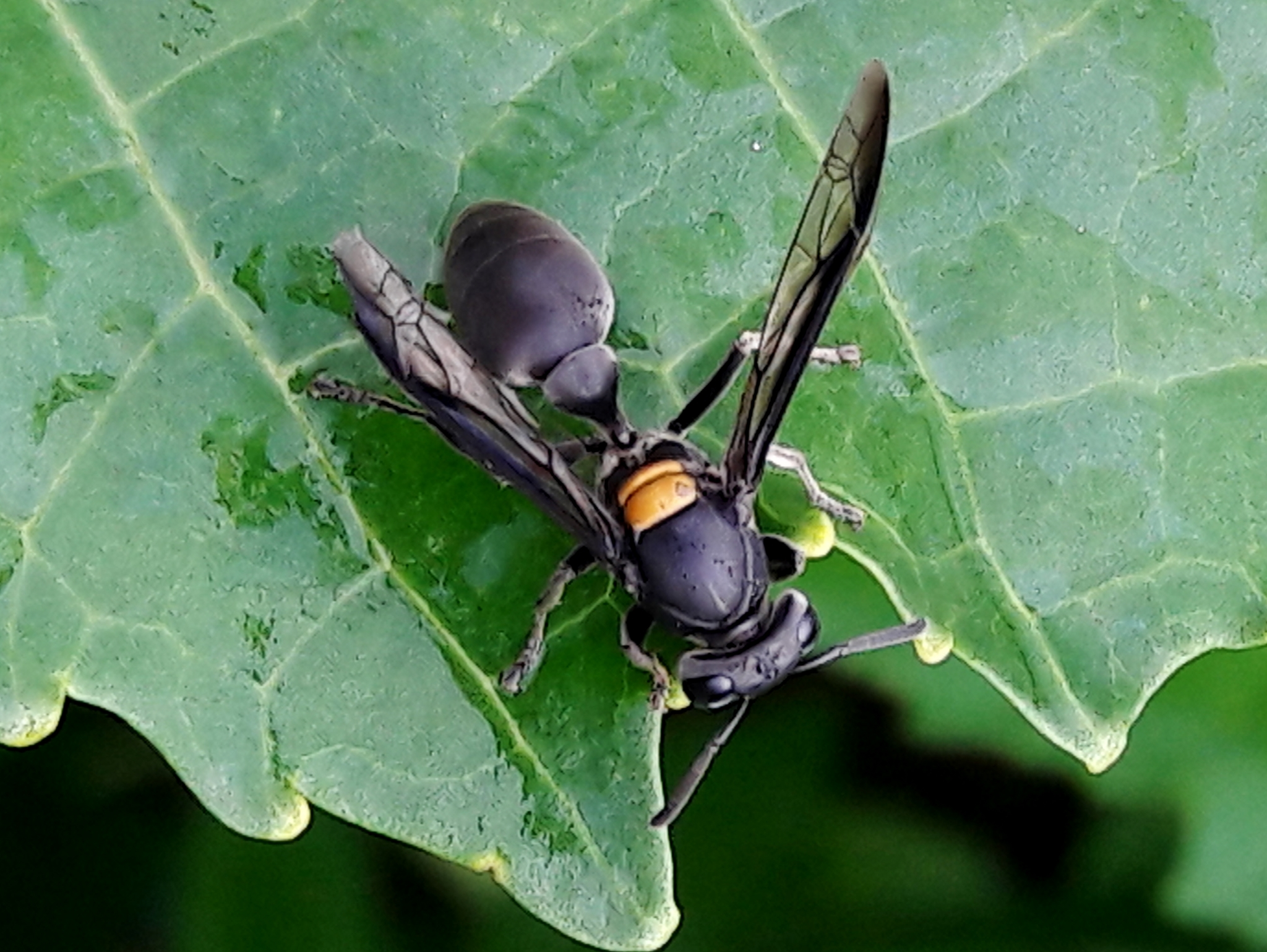
Polybia (Apopolybia) jurinei

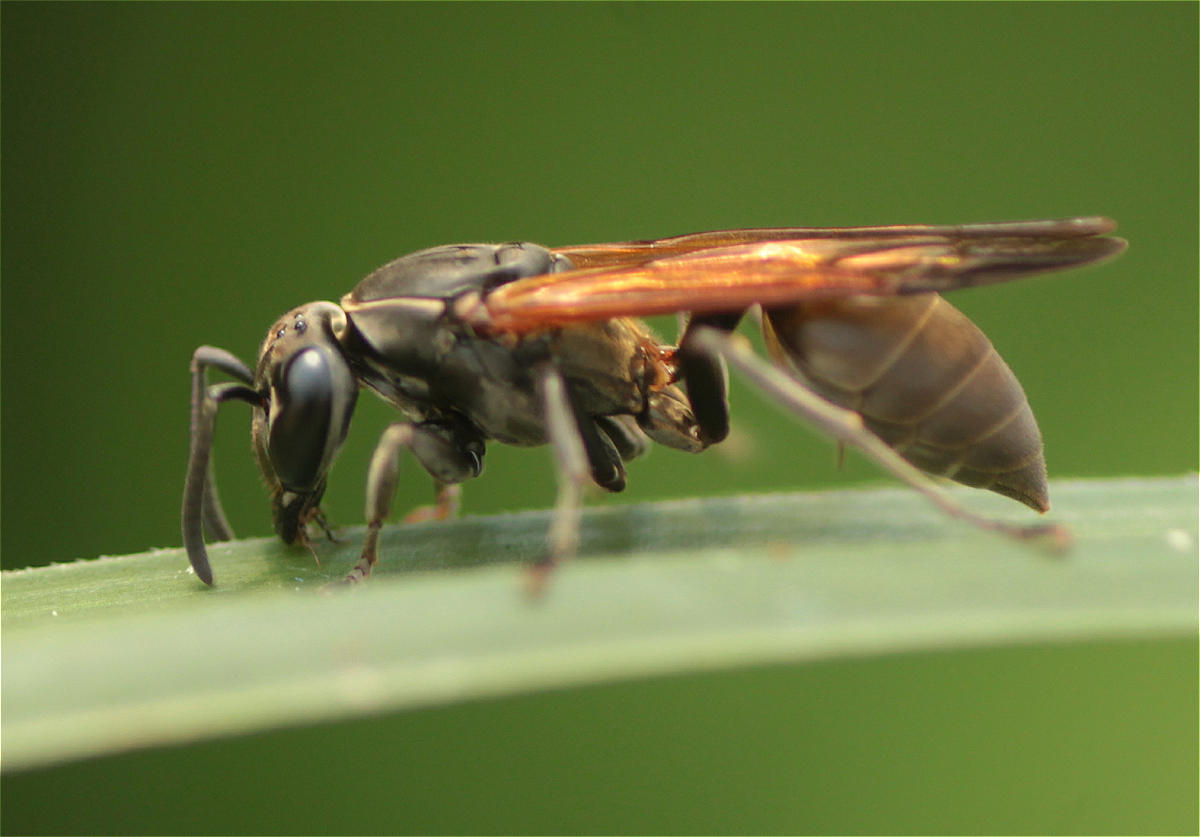
Polybia (Formicicola) rejecta

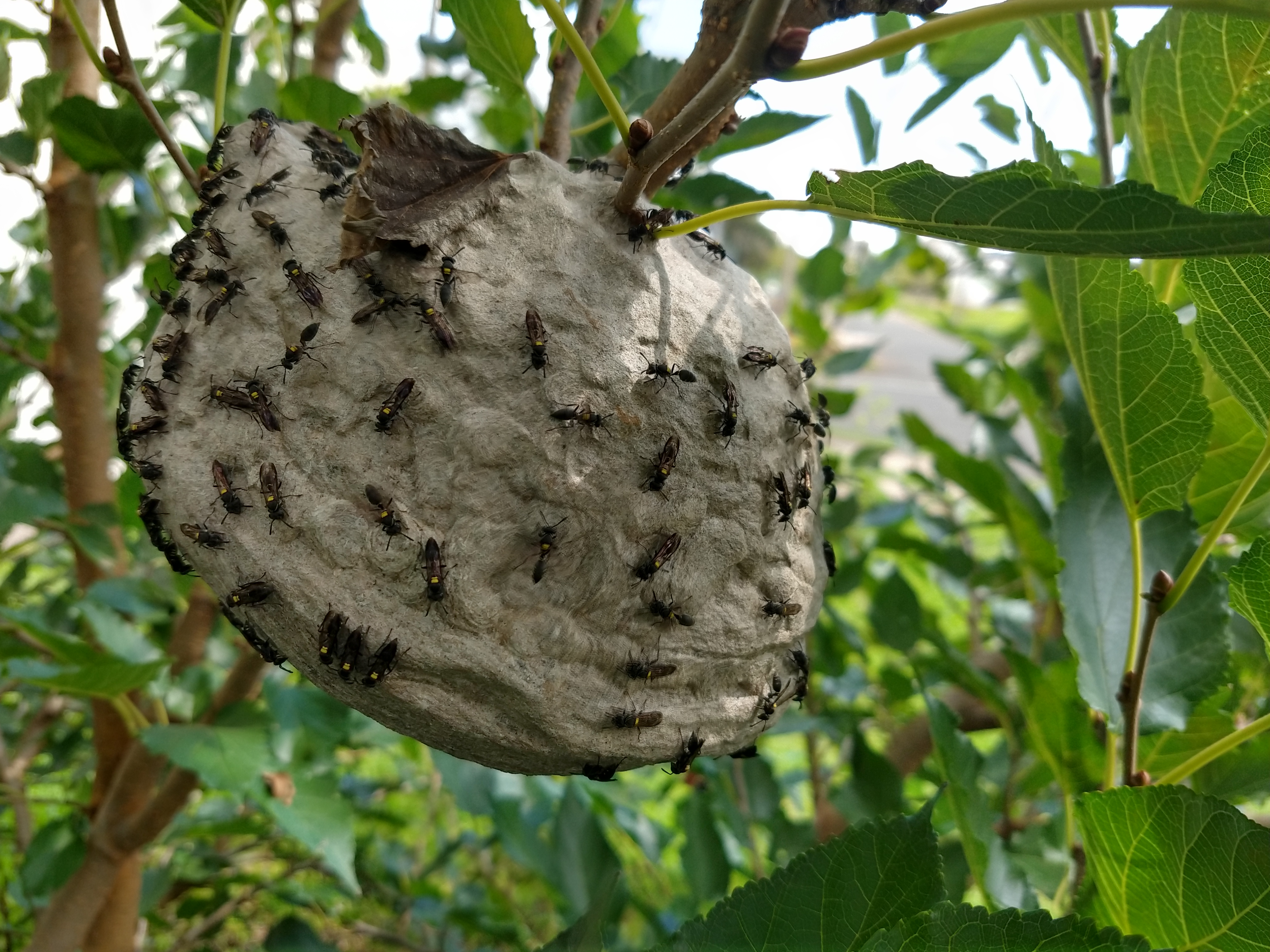
Polybia (Myrapetra) paulista nest

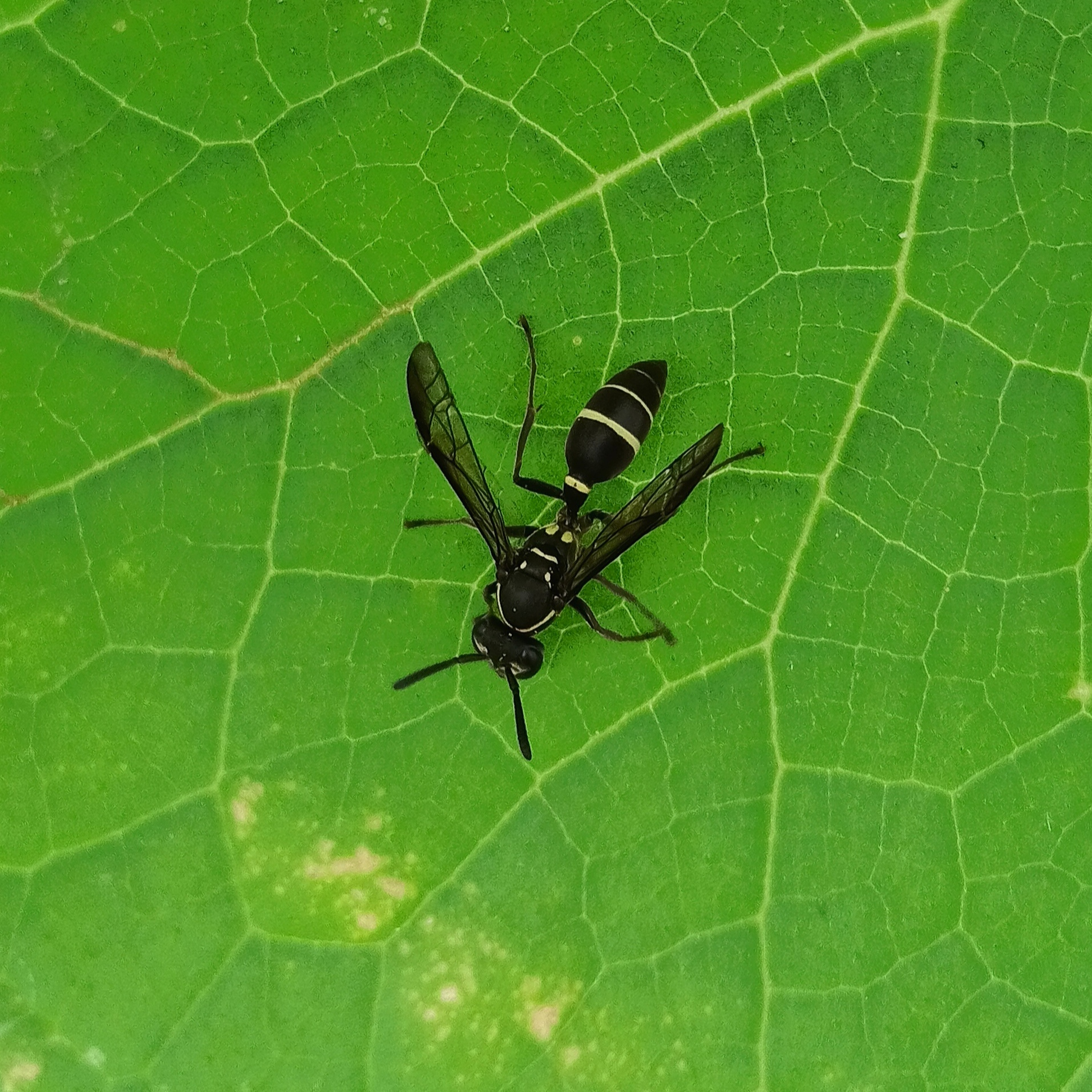
Polybia (Myrapetra) plebeja

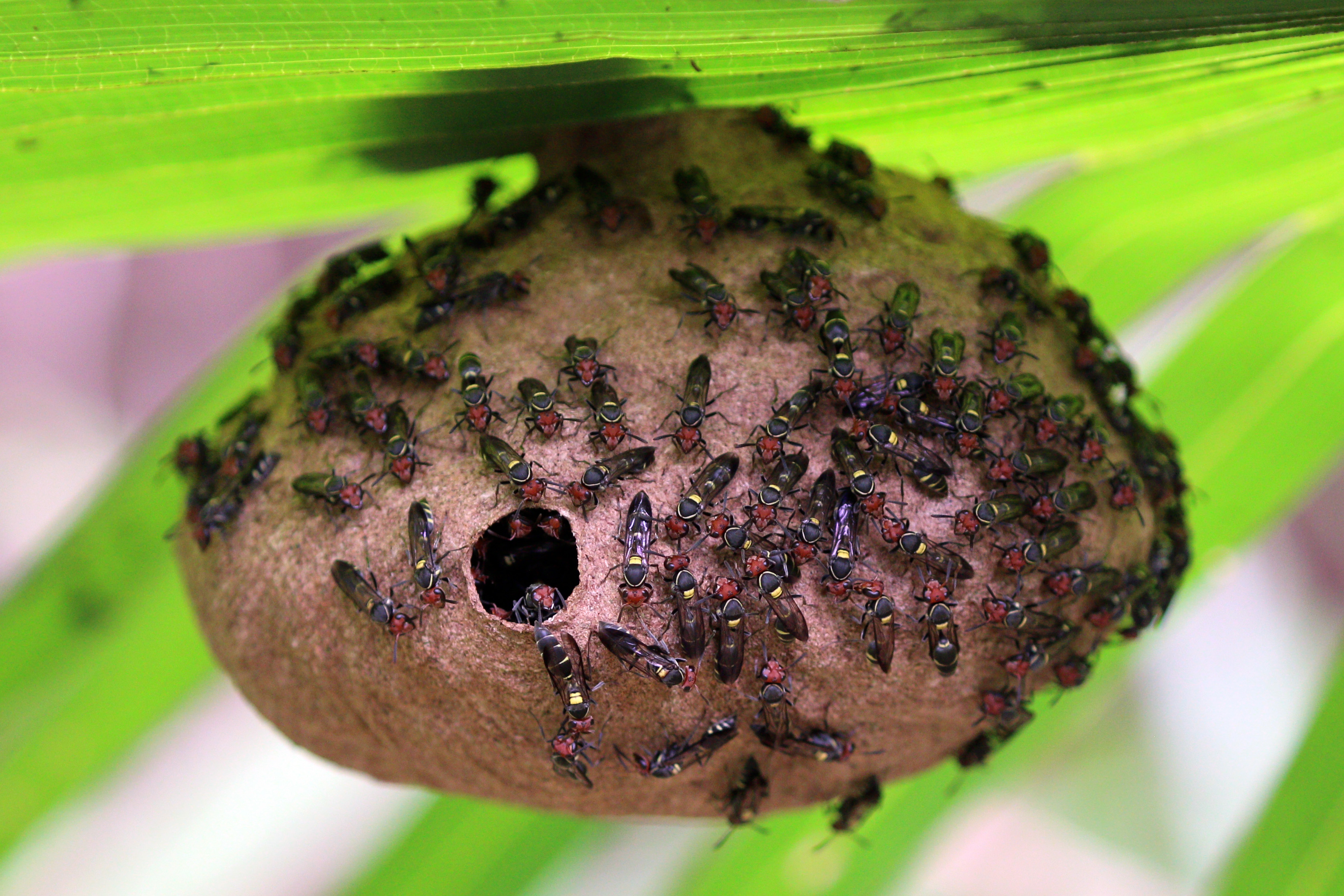
Polybia (Myrapetra) ruficeps ruficeps

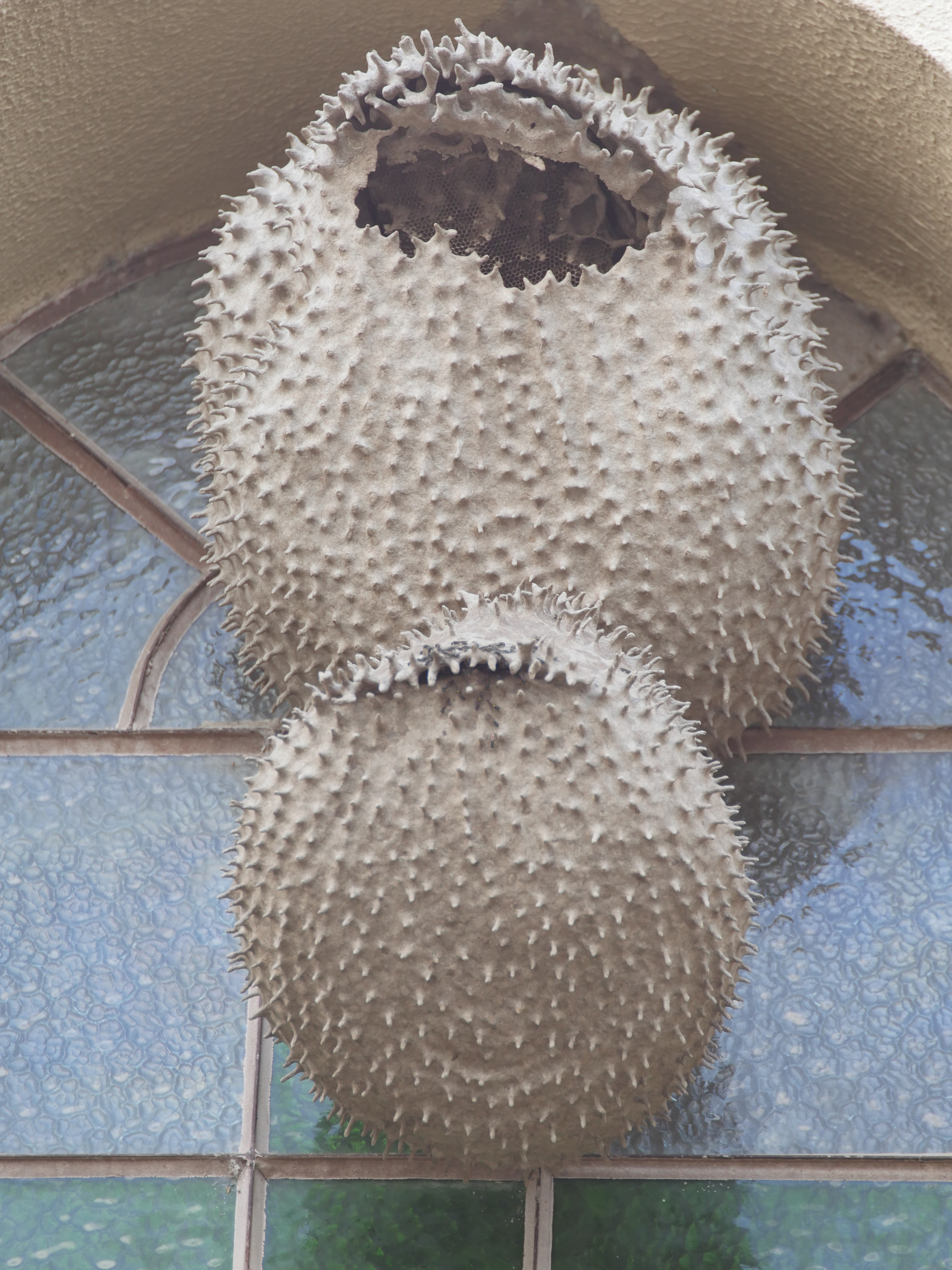
Polybia (Myrapetra) scutellaris nest in the State of Paraná, Brazil

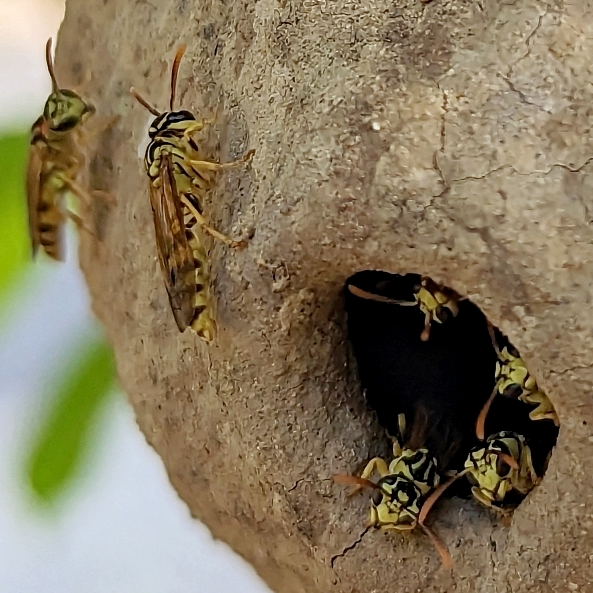
Polybia (Pedothoeca) emaciata

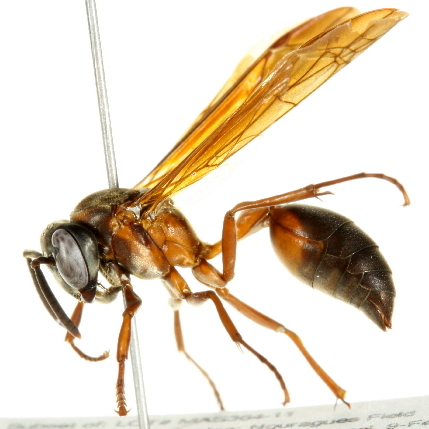
Polybia (Trichinothorax) affinis

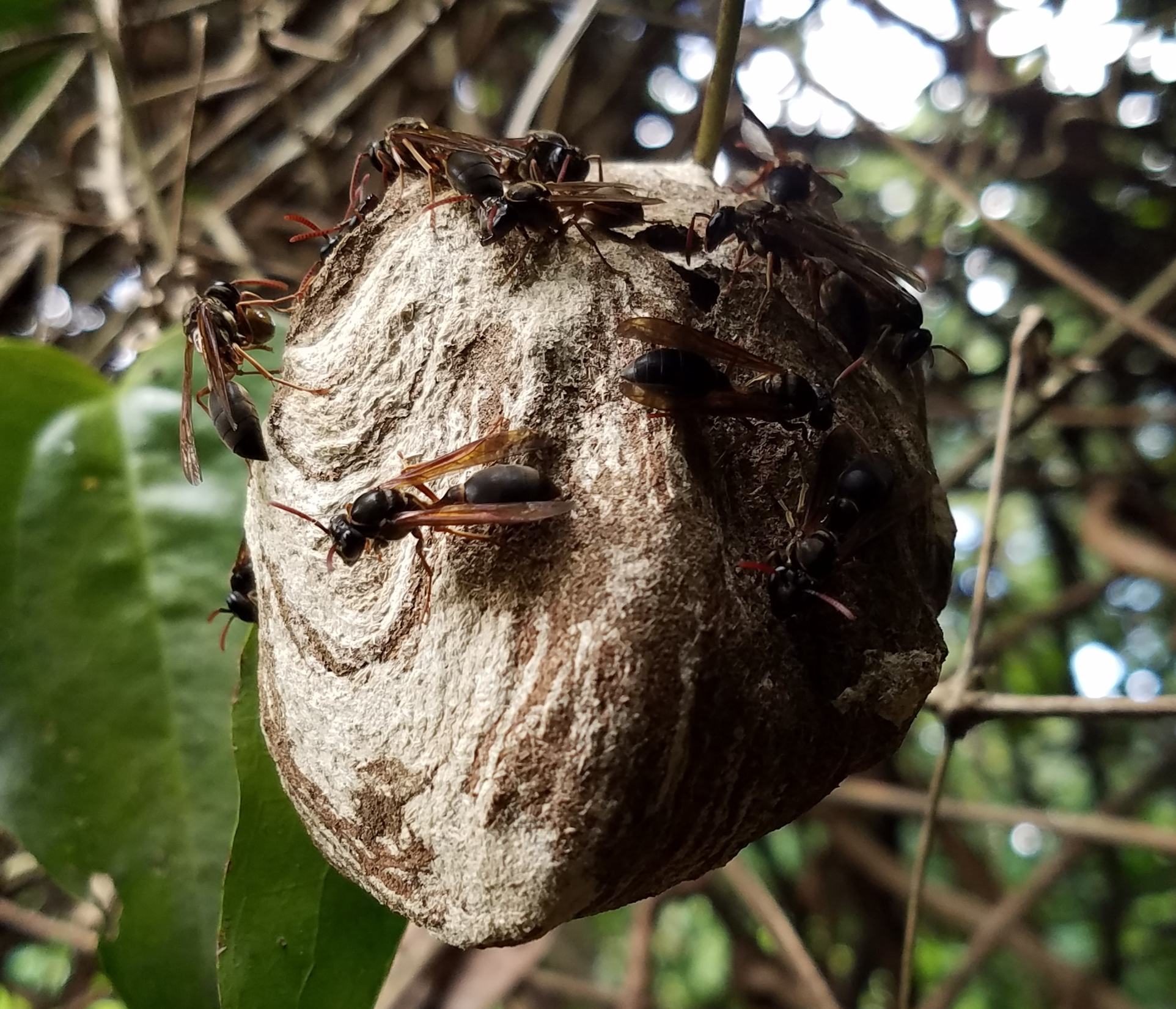
Polybia (Trichinothorax) flavitincta

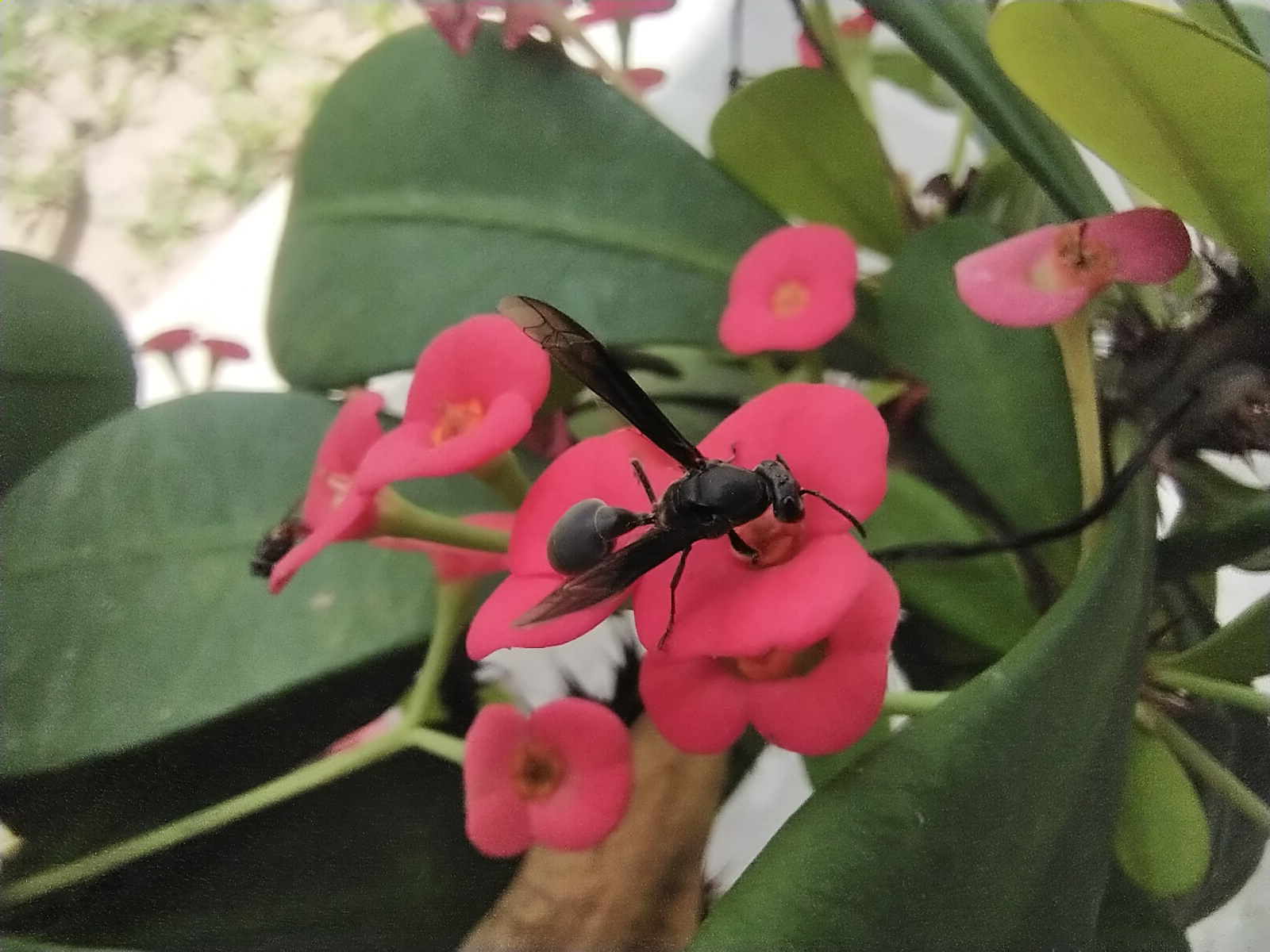
Polybia (Trichinothorax) ignobilis

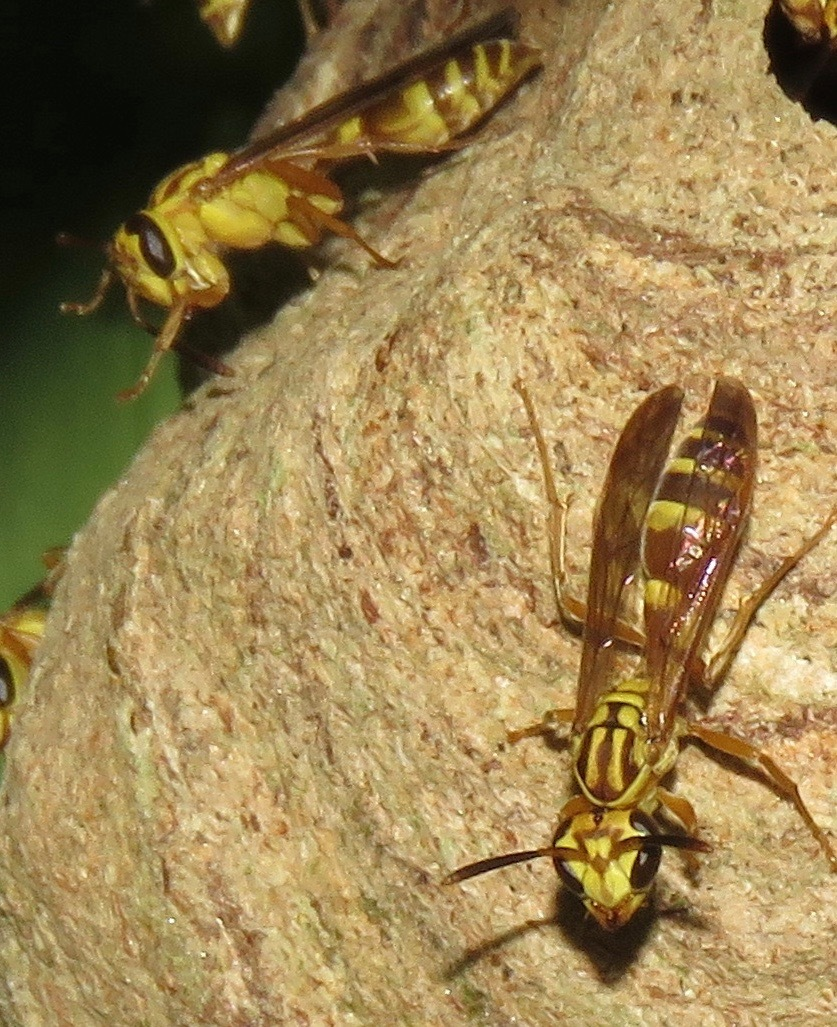
Polybia (Trichinothorax) selvana

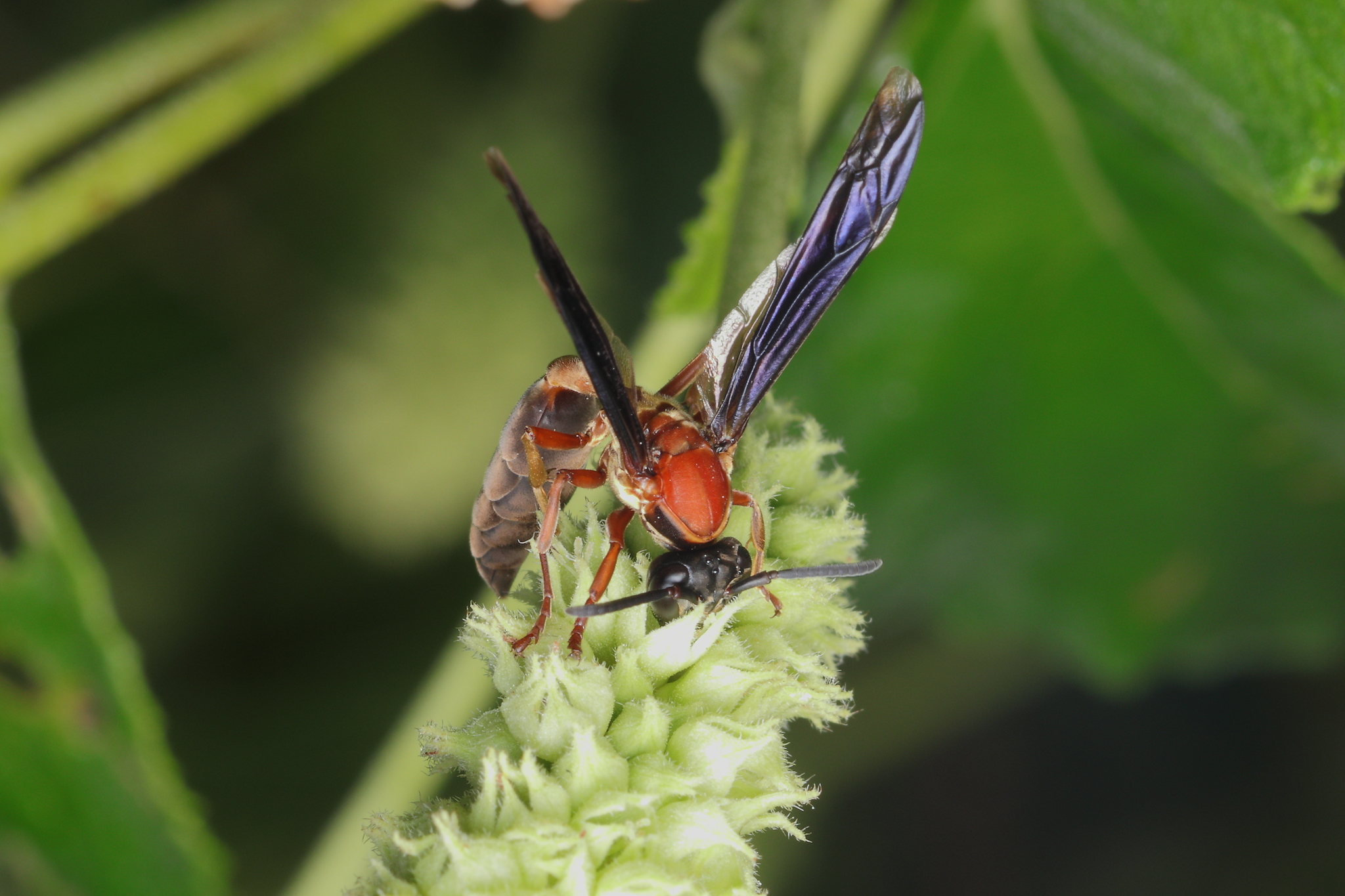
Polybia (Trichinothorax) sericea

=== Fossil species ===
- Polybia anglica Cockerell, 1921
- Polybia oblita Cockerell, 1921
