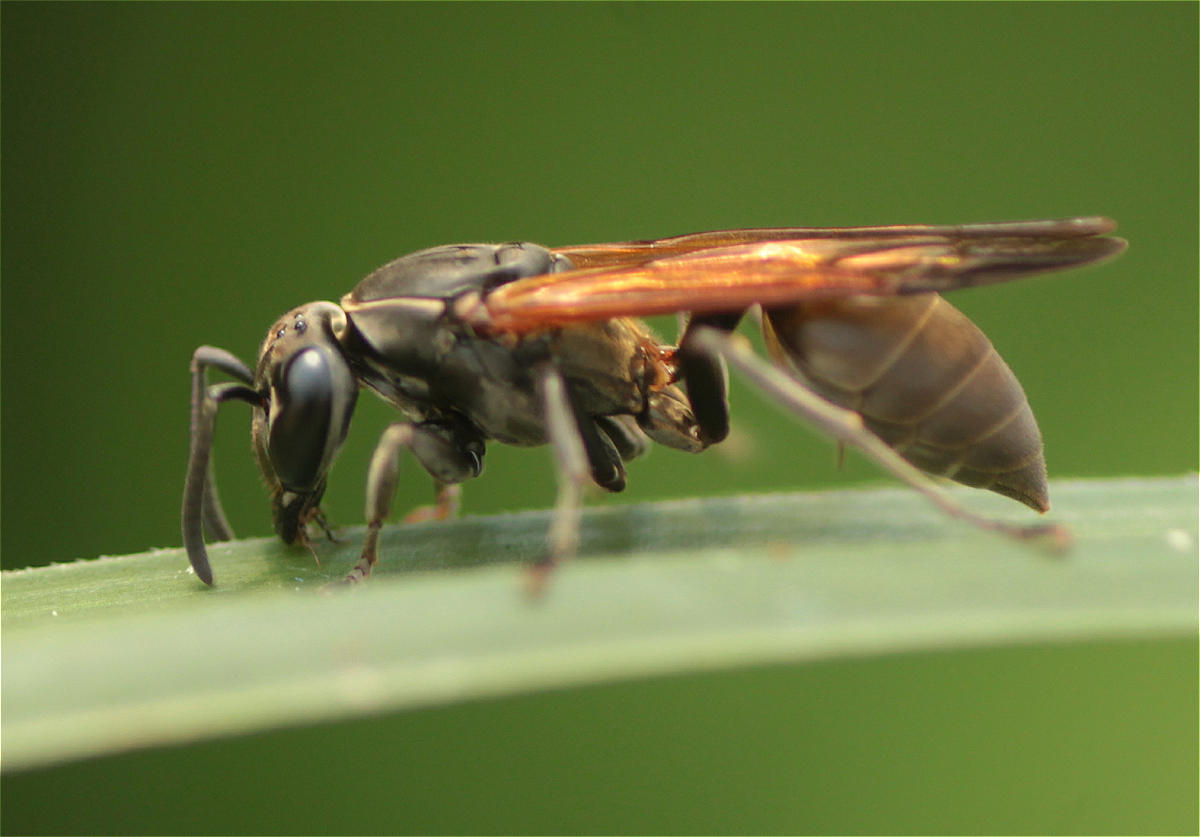

Scientific classification
- Kingdom: Animalia
- Phylum: Arthropoda
- Clade: Pancrustacea
- Class: Insecta
- Order: Hymenoptera
- Family: Vespidae
- Genus: Polybia
- Subgenus: Formicicola
- Species: P. rejecta

Binomial name
- Polybia rejecta (Fabricius, 1798)

Synonyms
- Polybia rejecta var. belizensis Cameron, 1906; Polybia rejecta race javaryensis Cameron, 1906; Polybia litoralis Zavattari, 1905 Polybia bicolor Smith, 1857; Vespa rejecta Fabricius, 1798

= Polybia rejecta =

Species of wasp

Polybia rejecta is a species of social wasp found in the Neotropics region of the world. It was first described by Fabricius in South America in the 1790s. The wasp is associated with many other organisms, particularly specific species of ants and birds such as the Azteca ants and the cacique birds. This association is most beneficial to the ants and birds because of the aggressive protective nature of the wasp. The wasps will protect their nest even if it means death against any predator that approaches it and therefore this means that the association also protects the ants and birds. Additionally, the wasp is known for eating the eggs of red-eyed tree frogs as a main way of subsistence. It also, like many other wasp species, has a caste system of queens and workers that is evident by difference in body size among the wasps; the biggest female becomes the queen.

== Taxonomy and phylogeny ==
Polybia rejecta is a social wasp in the genus Polybia, which is composed of eusocial wasps in South America, particularly Brazil and Argentina. The eusocial characteristics seen in this wasp species are the presence of cooperative brood care, division of labor between non-reproductive and reproductive individuals, and overlapping of generations in the colony. Polybia comprises around 60 wasp species. It was described by Fabricius in 1798 in South America. The genus Polybia is classified in the tribe Epiponini within the subfamily Polistinae of Vespidae.

== Distribution ==
The wasp Polybia rejecta occurs from Mexico south to Brazil. The typical climate that P. rejecta occupies in the Atlantic forest of Brazil is hot and humid. There are two distinct seasons, one being hot/humid and the other being dry/cool. In general, this area gets precipitation of 1350 to 1900 mm a year with the altitude ranging between 236 and 515 meters. Polybia rejecta has been found in the vicinity of a species of frogs called A. callidryas in the Brazilian Amazon region. This association is also present with specific ant species. Both of these species use the wasp's aggressive tendencies as protection against predators.

== Description and habitat ==
Polybia rejecta has an almost completely black body that separates itself due to its sting autotomy. It has a small rounded head with short antennae, thin body and thin wings. The distribution of the wasp is very dependent on the location of water bodies. Many aquatic macrophytes are important foraging targets for the wasps. The species is generally found in association with Azteca andreae and nests of various bird species. In general the reason for the nests being near the ant is that it can provide protection against army ants. Nests for these wasps have been found on several plant species. Each comb is covered by an envelope and succeeding combs are built on the already made envelopes.

== Colony cycle ==
The pace and timing of the colony cycle varies greatly with the climate and biotic factors. Additionally the colonies will generally gravitate towards previously established nests. This nesting association is a characteristic that is unique to P. rejecta. By nesting in such high densities, nesting must be great enough to offset the increased competition for food. Polybia rejecta produces its males in February to April. Otherwise not much is known about the colony cycle of the social wasps.

== Nesting near Azteca chartifex ==
Azteca chartifex is a species of ant commonly associated with P. rejecta colonies. This association was studied in the Parque Estadual do Rio Doce, where twelve colonies of P. rejecta were observed. The wasps tend to build their nests in a 10-20 centimeter proximity to the ants' home. The wasps' nests tend to be smaller than the ones away from the ants' colony, and of a similar coloring to the ants. This makes it hard to differentiate the wasps' nests from the ants'. All of the twelve nests found and observed were associated with the Azteca chartifex, meaning that there must be some kind of benefit for both the wasps and the ants. It was concluded that the wasp's aggressive behavior likely protects the ants from any mammalian, bird or snake predators that try to approach the nest. The protection that the wasp can offer from predators, especially mammalian predators, can help preserve the ant colony's numbers as well as preserve the ant's nest. Regardless of the wasp's aggressive behavior, there was no aggression between the ants and wasps, meaning that this coexistence must also benefit the wasp colony with additional protection from predators.

The first published description about this interaction between P. rejecta and A. chartifex was from William D. Hamilton, and may be found in the Chapter 8 (Volume 1) of the book Narrow Roads of Gene Land (1996, Freeman Spektrum).

== Queens vs workers ==
Polybia rejecta queens are significantly larger than workers. Among this group the castes can be noticed by simply looking at the size of the queens versus the workers as determined by using the Wilk's Lambda range. There are two possibilities behind why this significant difference in size occurs among the wasps. The first is the ovarian condition of the wasp. The workers have less developed ovaries than the queen's; therefore, it is possible that this lack of development results in a smaller body size for the workers. In accordance, the second reasoning is that, in some workers, the ovaries can be fully developed; however, the eggs are not completely developed. This would also be related to the decrease in size for the workers. Finally, the workers are likely smaller, so the queen can exert her dominance over them. The queen is the sole reproductive individual in the colony. This means the distinction in body size is a result of the individual being reproductively capable or non-reproductive. These morphological differences and caste differentiation are also seen in the species Polybia sericea.

=== Ovarian development ===
There are three types of ovarian development seen among P. rejecta. The first type is when one ovary has one filamentous ovariole but no visible oocytes or very small oocytes. An ovariole is one of the tubes of the ovaries of a wasp and the oocytes are what will potentially become eggs. This means that this first type of wasp is not capable of reproducing. A second type contains one ovariole with some young underdeveloped oocytes. This type of wasp is also non-reproductive, meaning that the workers will have one of these types of ovarian development. The third type is that of the queen and is well developed with very long ovarioles The ovarioles are coiled inside a gaster with at least one mature egg. The queens are the only females that are inseminated. This difference in ovary size is also seen in the wasp species Chartergus mentanotalis, Epipona tatua, and Polybia liliacea.

== Egg predation of red-eyed tree frogs ==
The red-eyed tree frog hatches its eggs early as a result of egg predation by P. rejecta. The vegetation that frogs attach their eggs to typically hangs over a water source, making them susceptible to attack by arboreal and aerial predators. P. rejecta are known for their predation of soft bodied arthropods, especially lepidopteran larvae and anuran embryos. In fact, this predation is a primary subsistence method for the wasps. The wasps will attack generally about half of the egg clutches they find, killing almost a quarter of the eggs in clutches in the process. In order to counteract the attacks made by P. rejecta the frog embryos hatch earlier, up to three times as early compared to embryos that are not likely to be attacked. Once the embryos hatch, all of the frogs are able to escape, making this a successful adaption by the frogs to prevent predation by P. rejecta. Additionally, the wasps primarily attack only living eggs. If the wasp encounters a clutch with dead embryos, it rejects the carrion and moves on to find clutches with living eggs. The wasp has also been found to attack other frog eggs of the species A. saltator in Costa Rica.

=== Method of egg predation ===
The wasps will attack and remove the embryos from a clutch one at a time. The amount and type of damage on the embryo is highly dependent on how easily eggs detach from the clutch, as well as the development of the embryo. When the wasp attacks the egg, it grasps the individual egg with its mouth and simply pull. After it pulls out the egg, the wasp will then work on getting the embryo out of the egg. If the embryo is more developed and able to struggle, the wasp will drag the embryo around the leaf and bite it. This is in an attempt to subdue and further damage the embryo. However, with younger embryos the wasp is generally able to break the yolk and extract a part of the embryo. The wasp will sometimes immediately consume the yolk and other times only carry a part of the tissue from the embryo, leaving the yolk behind. If the embryo was more developed the wasp will sometimes leave body parts of the embryo behind as it transports tissue to its colony. P. rejecta will typically do this with many eggs in a clutch in order to try to gain as much food as possible.

== Birds and Polybia rejecta ==
The cacique birds in Central Brazilian Amazon have been found to associate their nests with those of P. rejecta. The birds take advantage of the wasps through protection against potential predators. The social wasps defend their nests by inflicting painful stings and bites onto whatever predator is attacking them. These associations between the wasps and birds occur in most areas of the Neotropics; however, little is known about the benefit for the wasps from the relationship. Therefore, the relationship is defined as commensalism because the bird is clearly benefitting from the protective nature of the wasp while the wasp is neither benefited nor harmed as a result of the presence of the bird. Another interesting aspect of the relationship is that the wasps do not show any aggressive behavior towards the birds. This is uncommon, since in most cases any animal that gets into a certain distance of the wasp nest is immediately attacked. However, there is no aggressive behavior towards the cacique birds or their nests by the wasps.

=== Wren nests and P. rejecta ===
Wrens are another bird that associate with P. rejecta wasps in order to gain protection against predators. In an experiment conducted by Frank Joyce, it was found that wrens whose nests were near relocated wasps were significantly more likely to fledge young than were wrens whose nests had no wasp nests placed near them. With wrens, predation is the primary cause of nest failure; in particularly they are attacked by white faced monkeys. In an attempt to avoid predators many birds will build their nests in inconspicuous or inaccessible places, but this is not always a successful method of protection. Joyce moved the wasp nests to areas that were common to wrens. There was a significant increase in the success rate of fledging after the association with which occurs as a result of the presence of wasps. When the monkeys attempted to attack the bird nests, the wasps would in turn attack the monkeys because they were too close to the wasp nest.

== Human interaction ==
Stinging is the most important defensive tactic for Polybia rejecta. The wasp is very aggressive, especially when a human comes into a specific vicinity of the colony. The wasps will fly about five meters around the colony and will sting if a human gets any closer. This attack occurs with very little provocation by the human and also happens with other animals. Simply approaching the nest will generally elicit an attack. This sting is painful, but is not considered traumatic on the pain scale. Generally there are no serious health risks associated with the sting.

== Sting autotomy ==
Polybia rejecta participates in a self-destructive defensive behavior called sting autotomy. There are three different types of suicidal defense behaviors termed: instantaneous defense, preemptive defense and altruistic self-removal. Sting autotomy is the self-amputation of the stinger and poison sac by the wasp. Instantaneous defense leads to death of the wasp when it interacts with a predator. Preemptive defense is the assumption that anything approaching the nest is a threat. Altruistic self-removal is the defense by the workers in order to protect their queen even if that means death. This is the self-amputation of the stinger and the poison sac of the wasp.

Polybia rejecta is an aggressive wasp that is very protective over its nests. As previously noted many species of birds and ants will use this aggressive behavior to their advantage by nesting near Polybia rejecta nests. In sting autotomy the stinger remains in whatever individual has been stung. The stinger is severed from the distal end of the defender's abdomen. Because of this behavior Polybia rejecta has a body structure that allows its muscles to easily tear from the internal structures. Wasps that do not display this type of autotomy have abdominal muscles that prevent this bodily separation from occurring.
