= Chitin =

Long-chain polymer of a N-acetylglucosamine

Structure of the chitin molecule, showing two of the N-acetylglucosamine units that repeat to form long chains in β-(1→4)-linkage.

Haworth projection of the chitin molecule.

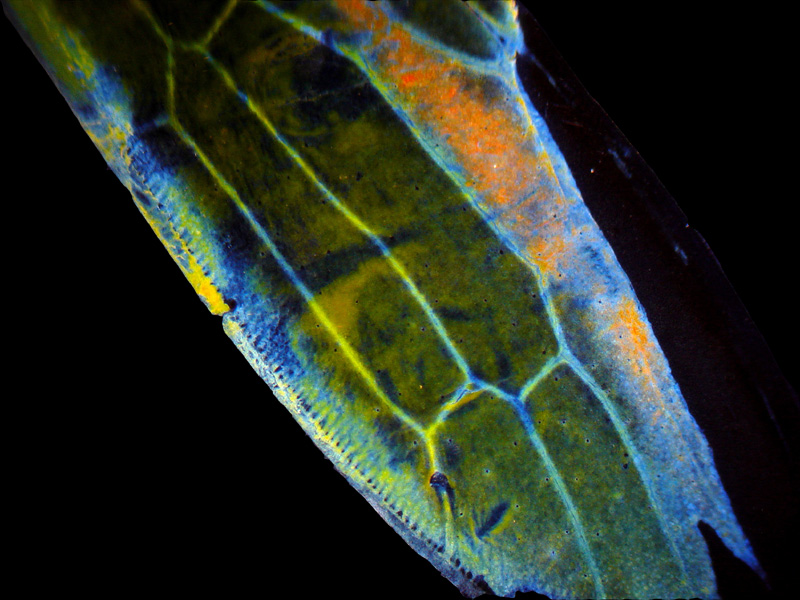
A close-up of the wing of a leafhopper; the wing is composed of chitin.

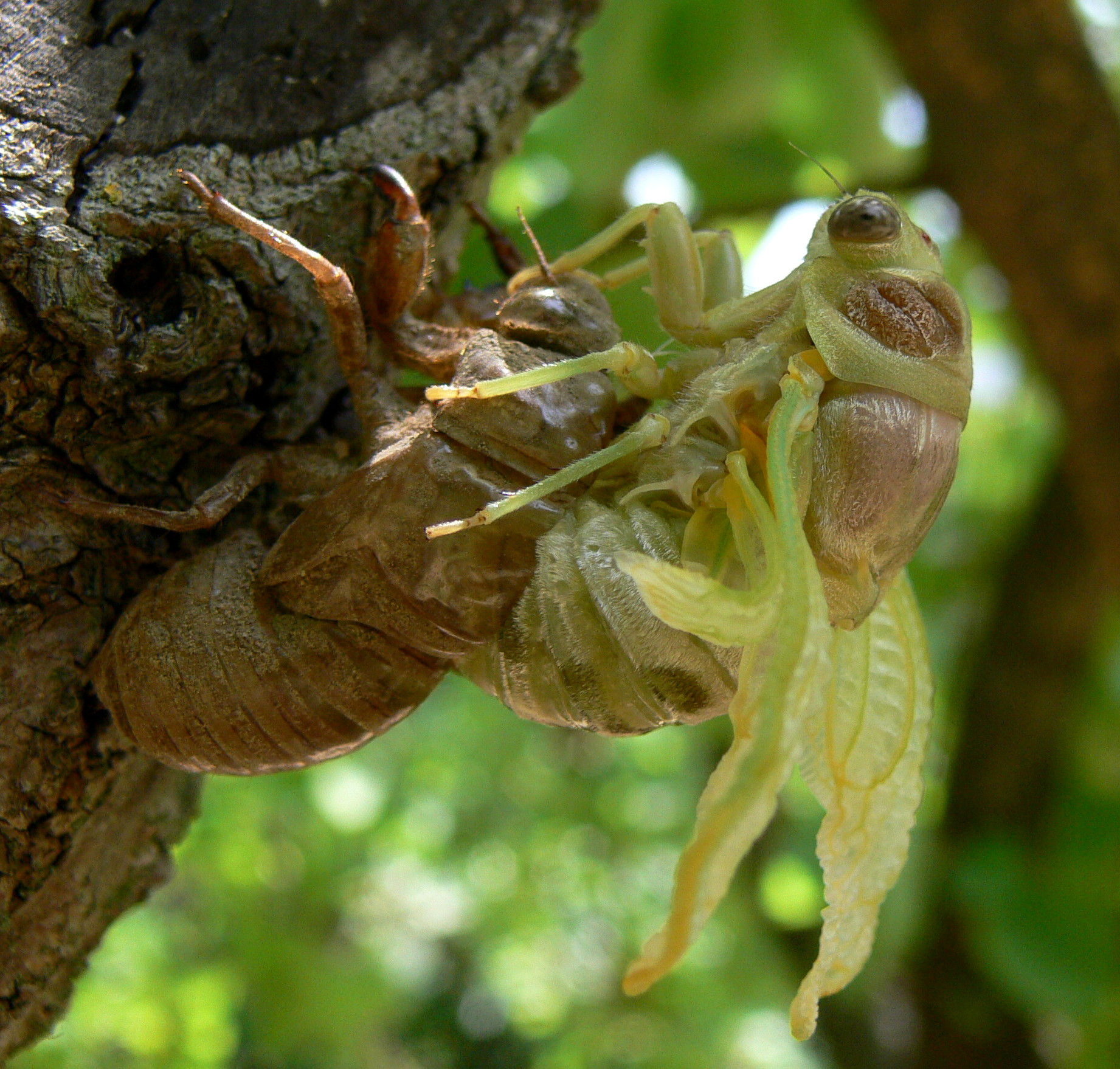
A cicada emerges from its nymphal exoskeleton; the shed exoskeleton is mostly modified chitin (sclerotin) but the wings and much of the adult body are still unsclerotized chitin at this stage

Chitin (C_{8}H_{13}O_{5}N)_{n} (/ˈkaɪtɪn/ KY-tin) is a long-chain polymer of N-acetylglucosamine, an amide derivative of glucose. Chitin is the second most abundant polysaccharide in nature (behind only cellulose); an estimated 1 billion tons of chitin are produced each year in the biosphere. It is a primary component of cell walls in fungi (especially filamentous and mushroom-forming fungi), the exoskeletons of arthropods such as crustaceans and insects, the radulae, cephalopod beaks and gladii of molluscs and in some nematodes and diatoms. It is also synthesised by at least some fish and lissamphibians. Commercially, chitin is extracted from the shells of crabs, shrimps, shellfish and lobsters, which are major by-products of the seafood industry. The structure of chitin is comparable to cellulose, forming crystalline nanofibrils or whiskers. It is functionally comparable to the protein keratin. Chitin has proved useful for several medicinal, industrial and biotechnological purposes.

== Etymology ==
The English word chitin comes from the French word chitine, which was derived in 1821 from the Greek word χιτών (khitōn) meaning 'covering'.

A similar word, "chiton", refers to a marine animal with a protective shell.

== Chemistry, physical properties and biological function ==
Chemical configurations of the different monosaccharides (glucose and N-acetylglucosamine) and polysaccharides (chitin and cellulose) presented in Haworth projection

The structure of chitin was determined by Albert Hofmann in 1929. Hofmann hydrolyzed chitin using a crude preparation of the enzyme chitinase, which he obtained from the snail Helix pomatia.

Chitin is a modified polysaccharide that contains nitrogen; it is synthesized from units of N-acetyl-D-glucosamine (to be precise, 2-(acetylamino)-2-deoxy-D-glucose). These units form covalent β-(1→4)-linkages (like the linkages between glucose units forming cellulose). Therefore, chitin may be described as cellulose with one hydroxyl group on each monomer replaced with an acetyl amine group. This allows for increased hydrogen bonding between adjacent polymers, giving the chitin-polymer matrix increased strength.

In its pure, unmodified form, chitin is translucent, pliable, resilient, and quite tough. In most arthropods, however, it is often modified, occurring largely as a component of composite materials, such as in sclerotin, a tanned proteinaceous matrix, which forms much of the exoskeleton of insects. Combined with calcium carbonate, as in the shells of crustaceans and molluscs, chitin produces a much stronger composite. This composite material is much harder and stiffer than pure chitin, and is tougher and less brittle than pure calcium carbonate. Another difference between pure and composite forms can be seen by comparing the flexible body wall of a caterpillar (mainly chitin) to the stiff, light elytron of a beetle (containing a large proportion of sclerotin).

In butterfly wing scales, chitin is organized into stacks of gyroids constructed of chitin photonic crystals that produce various iridescent colors serving phenotypic signaling and communication for mating and foraging. The elaborate chitin gyroid construction in butterfly wings creates a model of optical devices having potential for innovations in biomimicry. Scarab beetles in the genus Cyphochilus also utilize chitin to form extremely thin scales (five to fifteen micrometres thick) that diffusely reflect white light. These scales are networks of randomly ordered filaments of chitin with diameters on the scale of hundreds of nanometres, which serve to scatter light. The multiple scattering of light is thought to play a role in the unusual whiteness of the scales. In addition, some social wasps, such as Protopolybia chartergoides, orally secrete material containing predominantly chitin to reinforce the outer nest envelopes, composed of paper.

Chitosan is produced commercially by deacetylation of chitin by treatment with sodium hydroxide. Chitosan has a wide range of biomedical applications including wound healing, drug delivery and tissue engineering. Due to its specific intermolecular hydrogen bonding network, dissolving chitin in water is very difficult. Chitosan (with a degree of deacetylation of more than ~28%), on the other hand, can be dissolved in dilute acidic aqueous solutions below a pH of 6.0 such as acetic, formic and lactic acids. Chitosan with a degree of deacetylation greater than ~49% is soluble in water.

=== Humans and other mammals ===
Humans and other mammals have chitinase and chitinase-like proteins that can degrade chitin; they also possess several immune receptors that can recognize chitin and its degradation products, initiating an immune response.

Chitin is sensed mostly in the lungs or gastrointestinal tract where it can activate the innate immune system through eosinophils or macrophages, as well as an adaptive immune response through T helper cells. Keratinocytes in skin can also react to chitin or chitin fragments.

=== Plants ===
Plants also have receptors that can cause a response to chitin, namely chitin elicitor receptor kinase 1 and chitin elicitor-binding protein. The first chitin receptor was cloned in 2006. When the receptors are activated by chitin, genes related to plant defense are expressed, and jasmonate hormones are activated, which in turn activate systemic defenses. Commensal fungi have ways to interact with the host immune response that, as of 2016, were not well understood.

Some pathogens produce chitin-binding proteins that mask the chitin they shed from these receptors.

== Fossil record ==
Chitin was probably present in the exoskeletons of Cambrian arthropods such as trilobites. The oldest preserved (intact) chitin samples thus far reported are dated to the Oligocene, about 25 million years ago, from specimens encased in amber where the chitin has not completely degraded.

== Uses ==
=== Agriculture ===
Chitin is a good inducer of plant defense mechanisms for controlling diseases. It has potential for use as a soil fertilizer or conditioner to improve fertility and plant resilience that may enhance crop yields.

=== Industrial ===
Chitin is used in many industrial processes. Examples of the potential uses of chemically modified chitin in food processing include the formation of edible films and as an additive to thicken and stabilize foods and food emulsions. Processes to size and strengthen paper employ chitin and chitosan.

== Research ==
Chitin is deacetylated chemically or enzymatically to produce chitosan, a highly biocompatible polymer which has found a wide range of applications in the biomedical industry. Chitin and chitosan have been explored as a vaccine adjuvant due to its ability to stimulate an immune response.

Chitin and chitosan are under development as scaffolds in studies of how tissue grows and how wounds heal, and in efforts to invent better bandages, surgical thread, and materials for allotransplantation. Sutures made of chitin have been experimentally developed, but their lack of elasticity and problems making thread have prevented commercial success so far.

Chitosan has been demonstrated and proposed to make a reproducible form of biodegradable plastic. Chitin nanofibers are extracted from crustacean waste and mushrooms for possible development of products in tissue engineering, drug delivery and medicine.

== See also ==
- Chitobiose
- Lorica
- Sporopollenin
- Tectin
