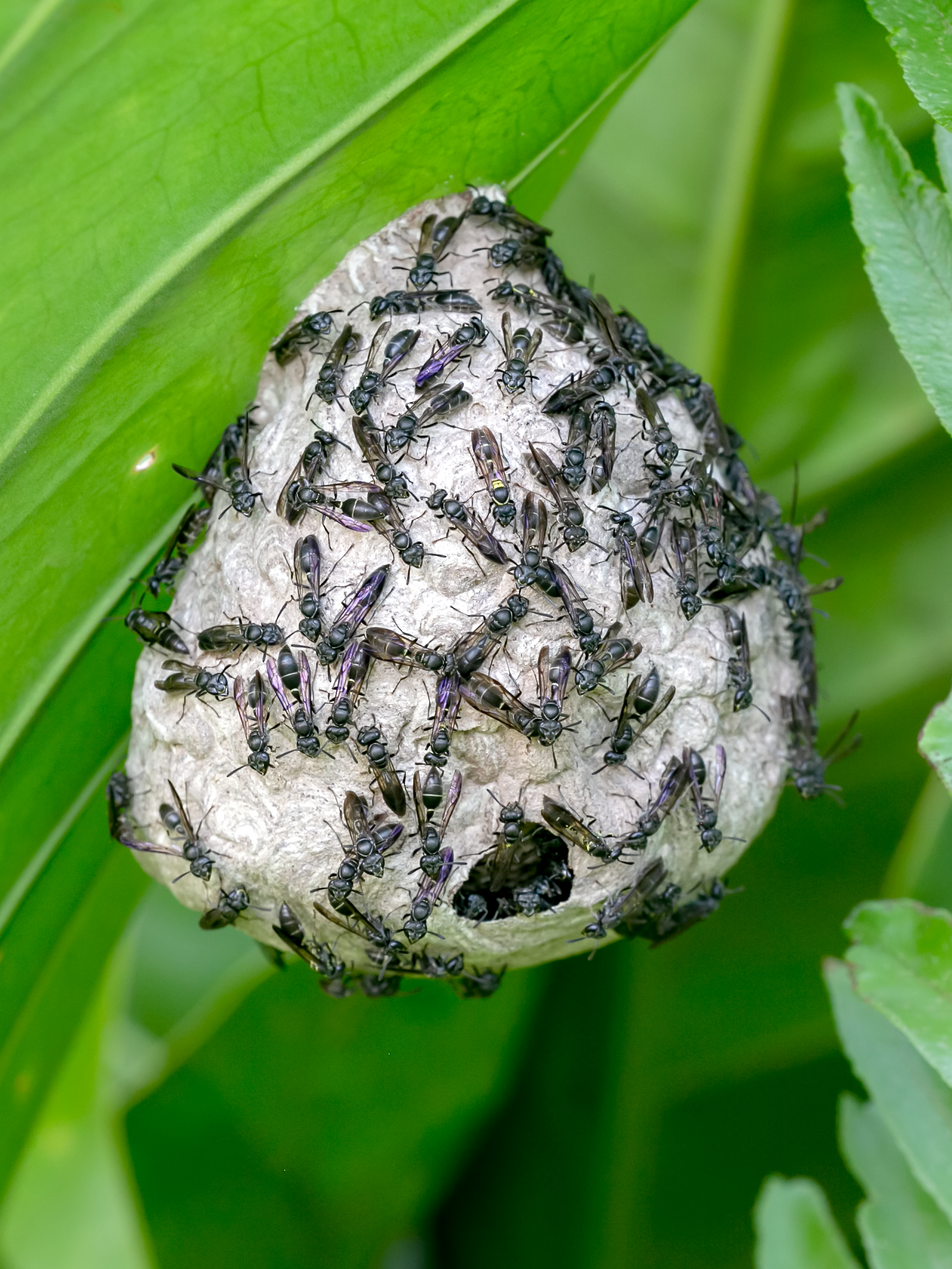
- Polybia occidentalis

Conservation status
- Data Deficient (IUCN 3.1)

Scientific classification
- Kingdom: Animalia
- Phylum: Arthropoda
- Class: Insecta
- Order: Hymenoptera
- Family: Vespidae
- Genus: Polybia
- Subgenus: Myrapetra
- Species: P. occidentalis

Binomial name
- Polybia occidentalis Olivier, 1791

= Polybia occidentalis =

Species of wasp

Polybia occidentalis, commonly known as camoati, is a swarm-founding advanced eusocial wasp. Swarm-founding means that a swarm of these wasps find a nesting site and build the nest together. This species can be found in Central and South America. P. occidentalis preys on nectar, insects, and carbohydrate sources, while birds and ants prey on and parasitize them. P. occidentalis workers bite each other to communicate the time to start working.

== Taxonomy and phylogeny ==
P. occidentalis belongs to the subfamily Polistinae. Polistines are one of six subfamilies of the Vespidae, and the subfamily contains four tribes, with Polybia belonging to the Epiponini.

== Description and identification ==
P. occidentalis is a black and yellow wasp - a black base with few yellow stripes on its abdomen. Its wings are thin and the thorax is attached to the abdomen by a long, thin petiole. Workers have a mean dry weight ranging from 3.80 to 6.71 mg. Its costal length ranges from 3.6 to 4.7 mm. Queen wasps are differentiated from workers because they have visibly larger ovaries, which are filled with eggs. Males are differentiated from workers and queens due to their visible testes.

== Distribution and habitat ==
P. occidentalis can be found from Mexico to northern Argentina . This species of wasp is common in Costa Rica and Brazil. P. occidentalis lives in neotropic areas that consist of tropical forests with strong wet-dry seasonality. These wasps nest in neotropic areas to have the appropriate resources for building and gathering prey in the wet season and surviving with these resources through the dry season. Neotropic environments are beneficial for swarm-founding colonies. They usually settle where large carbohydrate sources are available. P. occidentalis wasps build their nests in low areas and find shelter in trees, bushes, hedges, and even buildings.

=== Nests ===
Nests are made up of several (two to eight) stacked combs, each covered with an envelope. They are made up of wood pulp and water. The envelope of one comb provides the support on which to build the next comb. The shape of the nest is called phragmocyttarous, which means that combs are attached to the inside surface of the nest laterally. Usually, the number of cones is appropriate for the number of wasps in the nest. Nests are about 10–25 cm long. They are built in neotropic areas in shrubs and trees in pastures, hedgerows, forest edges, and on and around buildings. The nests are usually built in the morning. They are built by the workers through a division of labor; they are social wasps. The nests are built top to bottom to form a shape of a teardrop.

== Colony cycle ==
Due to the swarm-founding nature of P. occidentalis, a multitude of workers initiate a colony. Colonies are initiated and workers are recruited in the dry season, which is from December to April. Colony formation slows when resources become low in April. When the wet season starts in May, the colony is established and the wasps are able to find prey much easier due to the weather from May through November. The wasps that initiate the colony are mainly workers, but a few queens are present at the time, but no males are present yet. The numerous workers give rise to the division of labor and an increased defense system .

P. occidentalis colonies grow very rapidly, and the nest can be built in only a matter of days. The colony can grow to include as many as 10,000 members. The time of development from an egg to an adult is 30 days. The cycle of P. occidentalis is cyclic oligogyny, meaning that over time, the queens die and no new queens are produced until only one queen is left in the colony. This creates a bottleneck effect, where an entire colony is reproduced by one queen until other queens are produced. These future queens will be able to reproduce and continue the cycle. P. occidentalis colonies go through an annual cycle. Decline of the colony begins at the end of the wet season in November. Males are produced first, and then future queens are produced.

== Behavior ==
=== Dominance hierarchy ===
In the P. occidentalis species, a social dominance hierarchy exists. The queens are at the top and produce the brood and the workers right below them build the nests. Smaller wasps are higher up in social hierarchy. These smaller wasps seem to have more social interaction, which influences a division of labor and of age polytheism. Age polytheism is the system that wasps perform different tasks as they age. In P. occidentals, it refers to the age at which the wasps begin work outside of the nest. The larger wasps are sped up in this process and they work outside of the nest long before the smaller wasps take on these outside tasks. This implies that the larger wasps are removed from the direct reproduction tasks, while the smaller wasps are kept in the nest to be a part of reproduction. Smaller bodied wasps pass through age polytheism and are kept in the nest longer because they seem to have a higher social position in the colony, while the larger bodied wasps are viewed as subordinates.

=== Division of labor and cooperation ===
When building the nest, discrete division of labor occurs in the larger colonies and a more fluctuating division happens in smaller colonies. For larger colonies, all workers have a designated job. While each worker does its own job, it cooperates to form a cohesive, productive, and efficient unit. The jobs are water foragers, wood-pulp foragers, and builders. Water foragers gather water droplets from surrounding crops and give them to the pulp foragers and the builders. Wood-pulp foragers gather wood pulp from nearby fiber sources. Using the water received from the water foragers, the pulp foragers give the moist pulp to the builders. Builders receive the water and then the pulp. They use the water to moisten the pulp, and then they work this new mixture into the nest to create a stronger wall for the combs and the envelopes. After receiving the wood pulp from the pulp foragers, a builder divides that amount among other builders until she has the proper amount of wood-pulp she can work with. Also, in higher-populated colonies, the cost is minimized in time delay because so many wasps are doing the jobs and rotating in foraging and supplying the builders. This saves energy and time because each forager is making fewer trips to gather resources. Because the foragers take fewer trips outside of the nest, the risk of predation in larger colonies is reduced. In a small colony, the workers are more likely to rotate roles. This causes more expended energy and more time delays due to the workers’ constant need to make trips outside of the nest to gather resources. These costs affect the nest building.

=== Communication ===
==== Odors ====
P. occidentalis wasps have a way of indirectly communicating to each other in terms of information sources. As opposed to movement and verbal communication, they secrete specific odors depending on their food source. In various studies, information concerning where to forage was communicated through odors to newcomers from those that knew where the prey was due to experience. While this is not recruitment, because it is not intentional communication, newcomers are able to figure out where to find food sources due to information extracted from experienced foragers.

==== Biting ====
P. occidentalis engages in social biting to maintain worker productivity. This communication (a worker biting another worker) has been shown to regulate work among the foragers. Because foragers are bitten more often than nonforagers, the intent is clear. The bitten wasp, soon after it is bitten, leaves the nest, implying that the bite was effective. Because the worker caste is self-organizing, jobs will not get done if individuals do not do their assigned tasks. Therefore, a reminder comes in the form of these bites.

==== Alarm recruitment ====
P. occidentalis also has a way of communicating if a potential predator is in the nest. If the nest is rattled or threatened, alarm recruitment occurs through venom and venom-bearing structures in body. The alarm recruitment causes all adult wasps to move out of the nest to the outside to block the entrance and the nest from destruction and intruders. Although the wasps’ wings buzz for under a second when this threat occurs, the recruitment has nothing to do with the wing buzzing. The emergence from the nest is definitely by means of communication because a brief lag occurs between the jarring of the nest to when the wasps all emerge at one. This means that there was some initiating cue. Like the information gained for foraging by odors, during a potential predator threat, alarmed wasps cover the outside of the nest and drag the tip of their gasters, which evokes an odor. This specific odor lets others know that a threat to the colony exists.

== Kin selection ==
=== Genetic relatedness ===
Overall, P. occidentalis has a very high relatedness, primarily due to the number of queens in the colony over time. As the colony grows, the number of queens decreases. P. occidentalis follows cyclic oligogyny, which increases genetic relatedness among the colony members because over time, as the queens die, fewer queens produce offspring. The fewer the reproducers, the higher the relatedness. Therefore, the queens are essentially true sisters. The workers and males are also very high in relatedness, though no inbreeding occurs. In a newer colony with many queens, though, very low genetic relatedness is present. With fewer queens, the worker-to-worker relatedness increases because there are fewer reproducers. Their relatedness is 0.27 when studied with 409 workers. Although overall relatedness is high among workers, combmates seem to have a higher relatedness (0.41) as opposed to noncombmates (0.33). Both of these relatedness measurements came from 233 members of the colony. The queen-to-queen relatedness is 0.57 because the queens are essentially full sisters, but again no inbreeding occurs. This relatedness was measured among 216 queens.

=== Kin recognition and discrimination ===
No kin recognition is seen in P. occidentalis. The wasps can differentiate between those in their colony and those that are not, but not necessarily from comb to comb. This phenomenon is most likely due to the high relatedness among the colony because there are fewer queens. However, some studies indicate a very slight recognition and discrimination exists between which workers stay in the natal nest and which move to a new location and build a new nest and colony when there is destruction to the original nest. This discrimination would explain how the wasps decide which wasp branches off from the natal nest.

== Life history and survivorship ==
Overall, the colonies last for a year, as they have an annual cycle. To start the cycle, the workers and the queens build the nest and reproduce, respectively, at the beginning of the dry season. Throughout the wet season, males are produced first and then future queens are produced. Because the workers are the colony founders and they expend much energy in building the colonies, they tend to have a higher mortality rate, but workers in older, larger colonies live longer because they have more coworkers with which to build the nest. Therefore, they do not exert as much energy in building the nest as they would if they had been in a colony with fewer workers.

== Interaction with other species ==
=== Diet ===
P. occidentalis feeds on insect prey (such as caterpillars), carbohydrate sources, and nectar found in nearby locations. This species is one of the few wasps that collects nectar. After collecting the nectar, they then store it in empty comb shells.

=== Predators ===
Usually, predation occurs away from the nest. Mantises and robber flies prey on foragers who are trying to gather resources. Because there is less defense away from the nest, foragers are more likely to be prey for these predators. Also, nests are attacked by ants or vertebrates such as white-faced capuchin monkeys. This can lead to a loss of brood and it can destroy a nest. One ant attack cannot exterminate an entire colony, but it does cause a great deal of trouble for the colony because the colony must move locations. The workers attempt to rebuild the nest if possible. Also, the colony decrease in size and needs energy for the queens to reproduce. After more than one attack by the ants, though, the risk is higher for extermination of the entire colony.

=== Defense ===
When the colony feels harmed, they defend themselves using two steps. The first is the alarm recruitment when the nest is jarred. This cues many adult wasps to move to the outside surface of the nest to protect the nest and defend the entrance from the predators, for example from ants covering the nest or a bird trying to enter. The next step is to attack the predator if necessary. Because wasps react to the odor of venom, they use this as one cue to attack. If the odor of the predator is strong enough, then the wasps will attack. These wasps will try to sting the intruder by flying rapidly and directly toward the intruder with a great force. They most likely attack if the intruder has a specific visual stimulus, such as a dark color, as opposed to whether or not it is moving, as in Vespula. However, not all attacks are rapid and direct. The presence of alarm pheromone, another odor secretion from the predator, makes wasps fly, hover, land, and then inspect the odor source. This mechanism reduces the need for attack. Similarly, Polistes instabilis is a species that also defends the nest using these two steps, but does not use an alarm pheromone or odors.

=== Parasites ===
P. occidentalis wasps are parasitized by gregarines, a protozoan that can either be harmless or burdensome without being lethal. P. occidentalis is parasitized by these mostly during the wet season. When gregarines parasitize this species, it lowers foraging rates, along with changing other aspects of life. Nests infected by parasites are smaller, with fewer combs. Fewer brood are produced, so some combs remain empty. This parasite lowers adult mortality rate because predation risk is lower due to decreases in foraging. Workers seem to be suffer more from infection than the queens. Overall, this parasite reduces colony productivity and size, yet it does not eliminate the whole colony.

== Human importance ==
=== Venom ===
When tested in mice, denatured venom from P. occidentalis inhibited convulsions during seizures induced by bicuculline, picrotoxin, and kainic acid. However, this denatured venom did not inhibit seizures induced by pentylenetetrazole. These findings imply that the denatured venom could possibly help epilepsy in humans without having negative side effects to the neurological system. The neurotoxins in wasps’ venom lead to neurological effects in other animals. The venom of P. occidentalis worked well because it is from a neotropic wasps and it has a low molecular weight, implying the presence of free amino acids. These free amino acids would need to be further studied to determine their exact effect and mechanism. In the mice, as the venom increased inactivity, it simultaneously decreased grooming and exploratory and elevation behaviors. It also inhibited spontaneous locomotor activity, implying that a neurodepressant effect could take place which would result in this process being reversible and activity would depend on the dose given.
