= Fidel Maíz =

Paraguayan politician (1828–1920)

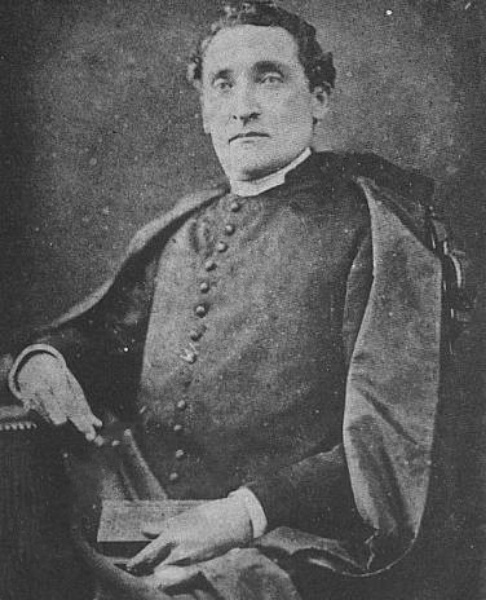
- Born: March 8, 1828; Arroyos y Esteros, Paraguay
- Died: 1920; Asunción
- Known for: Religion, Theology
- Notable work: Etapas de mi vida

Father Fidel Maíz (born March 8, 1828, in Arroyos y Esteros, Cordillera Department; died 1920) was a Paraguayan priest.

== Early life and education ==
Francisco Fidel Maíz was born to Juan José Maíz and Prudencia Acuña, who were married both legally and religiously. He had ten siblings, but only two survived the Paraguayan War. Maíz began his education in his hometown of Arroyos y Esteros and later moved to the capital, Asunción, where he studied under the Argentine teacher José Joaquin Palacios.

His education coincided with a period of educational reform that followed the death of the dictator José Gaspar Rodríguez de Francia, who had previously closed all educational institutions in the country. Maíz continued his studies at the Academia Literaria under the guidance of his uncle, Marco Antonio Maiz.

== First Steps ==
His older brother, who was ordained before him, served as the priest in charge of the churches in Lambaré and Valenzuela. After his own ordination, Francisco Fidel Maíz took responsibility for the church in Arroyos y Esteros in 1856. However, in 1859, he left this position at the request of President Carlos Antonio López to become the first dean of the Councilor Seminary, where he taught Moral Theology and Canon Law.

One notable aspect of Father Maíz's character was his ability to achieve a high level of intellectual and cultural development without leaving Paraguay, a rarity among his contemporaries. Despite the limited cultural opportunities of the time, he accessed the works of leading thinkers, including those with views contrary to Catholicism, which helped shape his own ideas.

When Francisco Solano López succeeded his father, Carlos Antonio López, as President of Paraguay, Father Maíz faced increasing difficulties due to his distant stance toward the new president. As a result, he was imprisoned for four years, along with Obispo Palacios, until just before the Battle of Curupayty. Although Father Maíz had once been a friend of Solano López, this friendship did not spare him from repression.

After the Paraguayan War, Father Maíz was imprisoned in Brazil for a time. He returned to Paraguay on December 5, 1870, at the age of 42, eager to resume his duties. Upon his arrival, he met with President Cirilo Antonio Rivarola to inquire about any restrictions on practicing his priesthood under the new government. President Rivarola assured him that his participation in the country's reconstruction was welcome.

Father Maíz then began to rebuild his life and work in Asunción. However, he faced challenges from Father Fideliz María de Avola, the Foreign Vicar responsible for the Church in Paraguay, who refused to engage with him, citing orders from the Brazilian delegate and suspending him from his priestly functions.

== Trajectory ==
Maíz received a notice on December 26, stating that he was forbidden from performing any sacraments as a priest. The next day, Maíz responded with a forceful letter, declaring his rebellion against the prohibition. When most churches were closed to him, the priest of San Roque, Blas Duarte, invited Maíz to join him at the pulpit for the mass in honor of San Blas, the patron saint of Paraguay.

After nine years of silence as a priest in the capital, Maíz hesitated but eventually decided to speak. At the time of this consecration, Bishop Moreno was gravely ill.

Bishop Moreno, like many members of the national clergy, strongly opposed the idea of a foreigner leading the Paraguayan Church. Article three of the new national constitution stipulated that the head of the Church must be a native Paraguayan. Consequently, before his death on May 30, 1874, Moreno named Father Maíz as his successor in a document, until a decision could be made by Rome.

Two days after Moreno’s death, Maíz sent this document to the Minister of Cults, and six months later, the bishop’s office officially accepted it, naming Maíz as the successor. Upon returning from Rome, Maíz was given the responsibility of directing the House of the Encarnación. He remained there for a while but, concerned about potential misinterpretations of his actions, requested a transfer to his hometown of Arroyos y Esteros. There, he began a long journey of community service, including the establishment of a school for local children.

Maíz maintained correspondence with prominent intellectuals of the time, such as Juan E. O'Leary and Ignacio A. Pane. He was also a close friend of Juan Sinforiano Bogarín, who accompanied him on his first tour as head of the Paraguayan Church.

In his writings, Maíz defended his name as a Paraguayan citizen who was involved in a devastating war and asserted his unwavering commitment to his country. He tactfully recalled the beginning of the war, noting that as a prisoner, he had no involvement in the political, diplomatic, or military decisions made by the Paraguayan government at the time.

"Torn by the plight of my country, and under the orders of my legitimate superior, I assumed the role of a soldier without compromising my priestly duties, mindful always of my natural condition as a citizen," he wrote. He emphasized the extraordinary circumstances of a deadly war that forced them to make difficult decisions, rejecting any responsibility for the bloodshed and seeking to clear his name and remove the canonical disqualification.

The letter is dated November 9, 1870. Shortly thereafter, the Empire provided transportation for a group of prisoners, including a priest, to return home.

== Style ==
Francisco Fidel Maíz distinguished himself from his contemporaries and successors by achieving a high level of intellectual and cultural development without leaving Paraguay. Despite the isolation during the dictatorship of Dr. José Gaspar Rodríguez de Francia, and the limited availability of cultural activities, Maíz accessed the works of the leading thinkers of his time, including those critical of the Catholic Church, which contributed to the depth of his ideas.

Maíz was a prominent and controversial figure, both as a priest and politician, and maintained close relationships with many of the most influential individuals of his era.

== Works ==
In his book Etapas de mi vida, Maíz recounts his experiences during the time when Francisco Solano López assumed the presidency. He describes hearing gunfire and recalls his reaction to the commotion, exclaiming, "Why are so many bells ringing?"
