= Trench newspaper =

Type of periodical from World War I

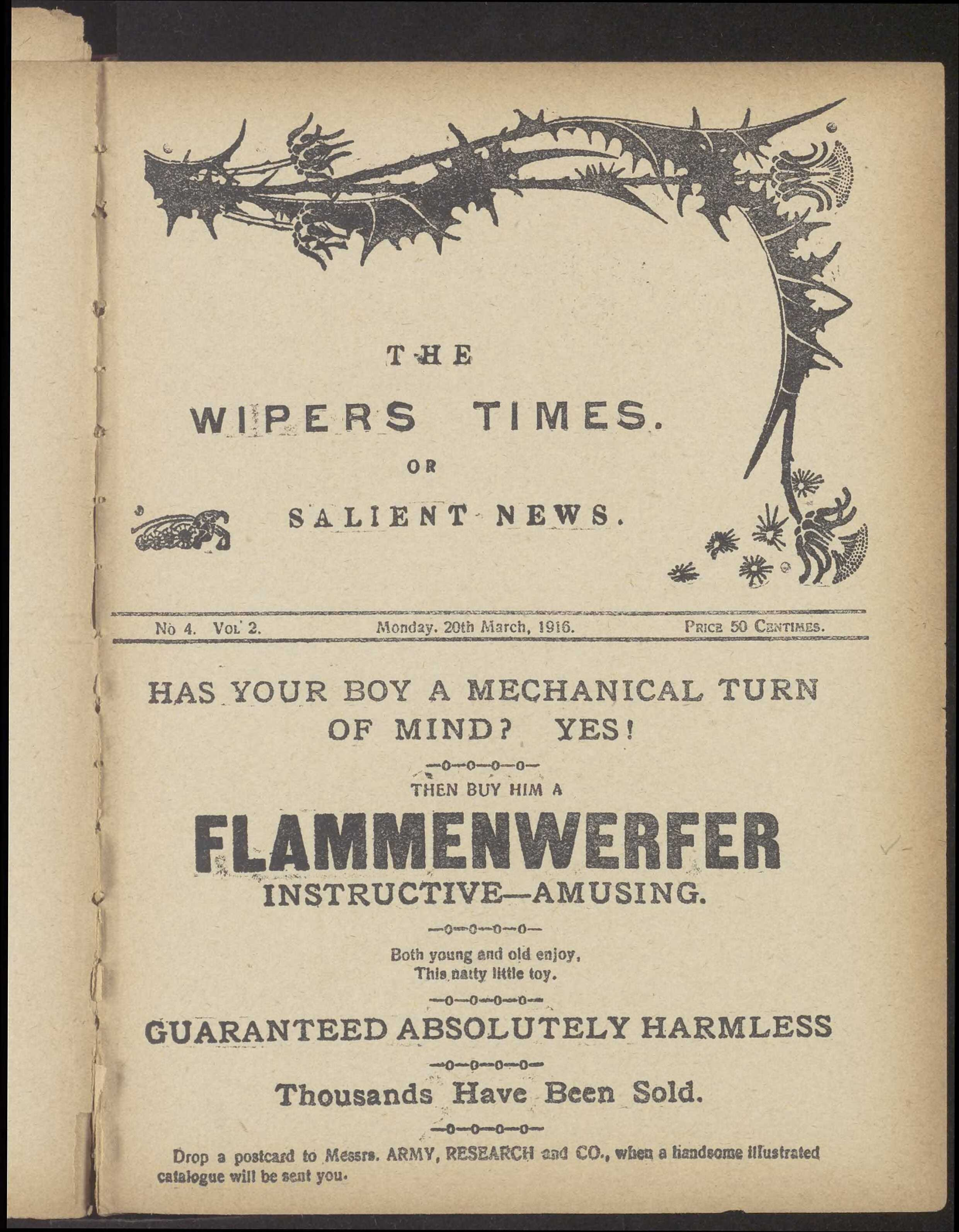
Using humor to deal with difficult circumstances: the English trench newspaper The Wipers Times is offering flamethrowers up for sale as toys.

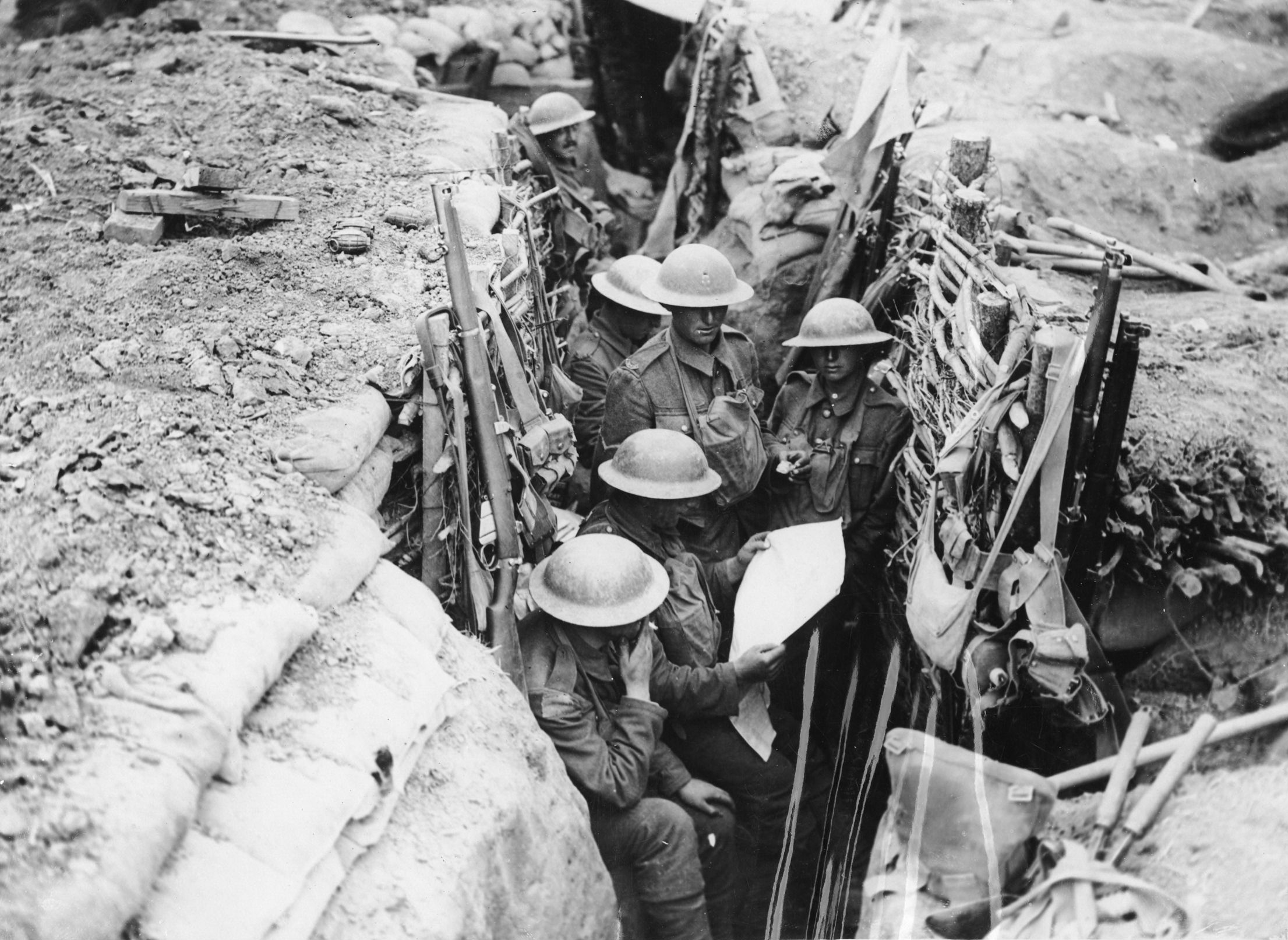
Soldiers reading a newspaper in a trench during the Battle of Messines (1917), 1,000 yards (910 m) from the enemy

A trench newspaper or front newspaper is a type of periodical that came into being during the First World War. Trench newspapers were produced for soldiers stationed at the Western Front, which had become bogged down in a trench war. They differ from the official military newspapers in that they were produced within the ranks or by private citizens.

== Content ==
Main topic of the trench newspapers were the soldiers themselves and the conditions they found themselves in. News from the soldiers' home regions also featured prominently, especially for Belgian soldiers, who were completely cut off from their mostly occupied country. Trench newspapers offered some relief to the soldiers and helped to keep morale high. From the trench newspapers, a lot can be learned about life at the front.

== Production ==
The production and distribution of trench newspapers were dependent on the situation at the front and the available supplies. The French troops were using gum to be able to copy newspapers. Many were published for a short while only, and those that lasted appeared intermittently. Still, some continued to be published after the war was over. Where no printing press was available, trench papers were typed or handwritten, and then multiplied using a mimeograph machine.

== Bibliography ==
- De Schepper, Susanna. "Front Newspapers". Abraham. Belgian Newspaper Catalogue.
- "Heritage of Global Significance: The Voice of Displaced Citizens". The Belgian Press from the Great War.
- "Les journaux de tranchées de la Première Guerre mondiale". Gallica, le blog. June 26, 2014.
