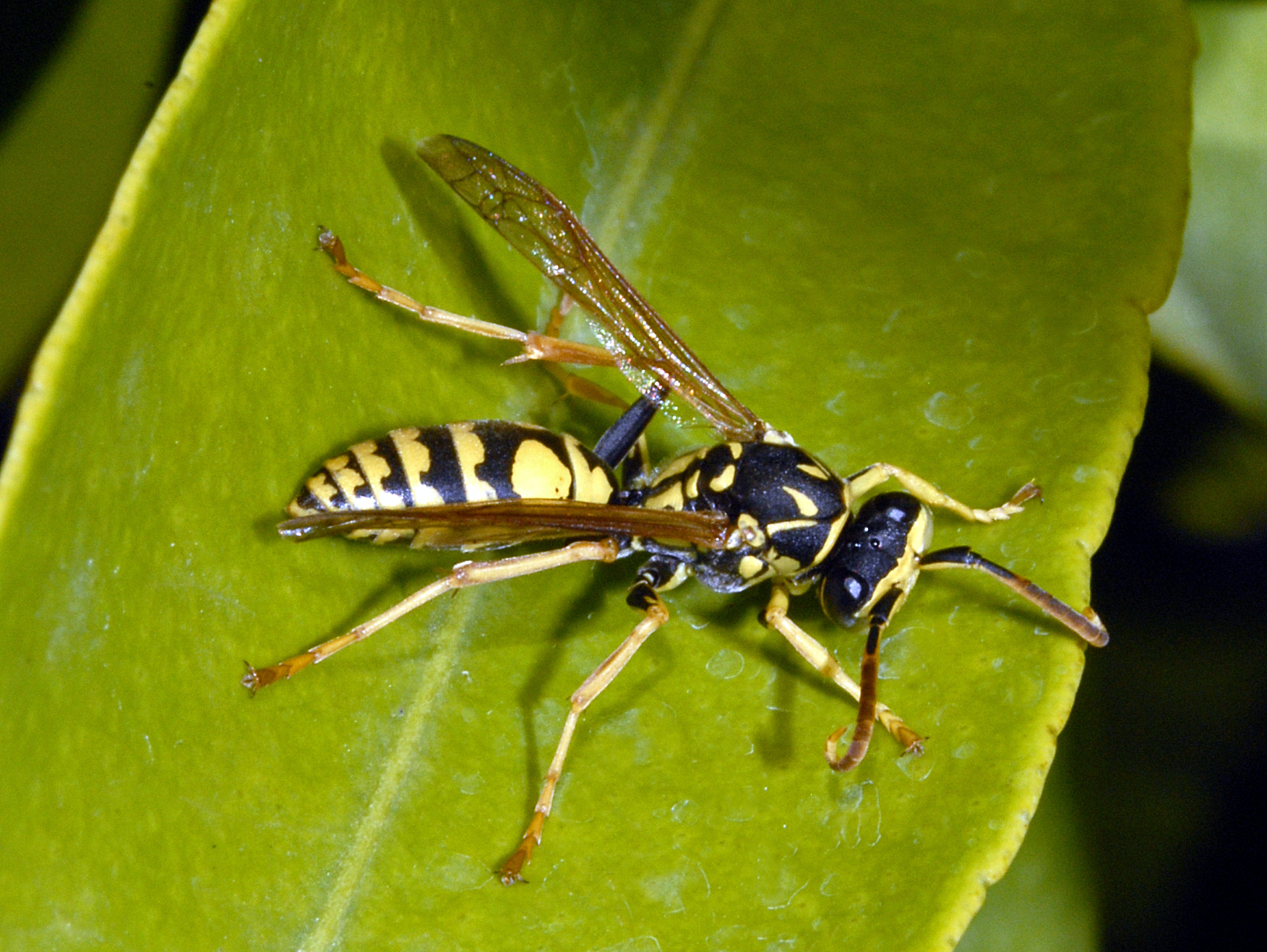
- Male of Polistes bischoffi

Scientific classification
- Domain: Eukaryota
- Kingdom: Animalia
- Phylum: Arthropoda
- Class: Insecta
- Order: Hymenoptera
- Family: Vespidae
- Subfamily: Polistinae
- Genus: Polistes
- Species: P. bischoffi

Binomial name
- Polistes bischoffi Weyrauch, 1937

= Polistes bischoffi =

Species of wasp

Polistes bischoffi is a species of paper wasps belonging to the family Vespidae.

== Description ==
Polistes bischoffi has a wingspan of 10–15 millimetres (0.39–0.59 in) and a body length of 9.9–14.1 millimetres (0.39–0.56 in) in females. These wasps are characterized by a blackish upper side of the antennae, by black cheeks and yellow jaws. The clypeus is yellow with a large black central stripe. Males show a yellow face. The body markings are variable.

== Biology ==
Adults fly from spring to autumn feeding on sugar and nectar and catching caterpillars and flies to feed the larvae. Males die before winter after mating, while mated females overwinter and in next spring build the cells of their nests made of a kind of thin paper. These nests are usually located outside of buildings or hooked to a plant stem or a trunk.

== Distribution and habitat ==
This species is present in the Mediterranean region, in Southern and Central Europe (Austria, Germany, Hungary, Italy, Switzerland), in the Balkan Mountains and in the Near East. These paper wasps can be found in woodland edges and meadows.

== Gallery ==
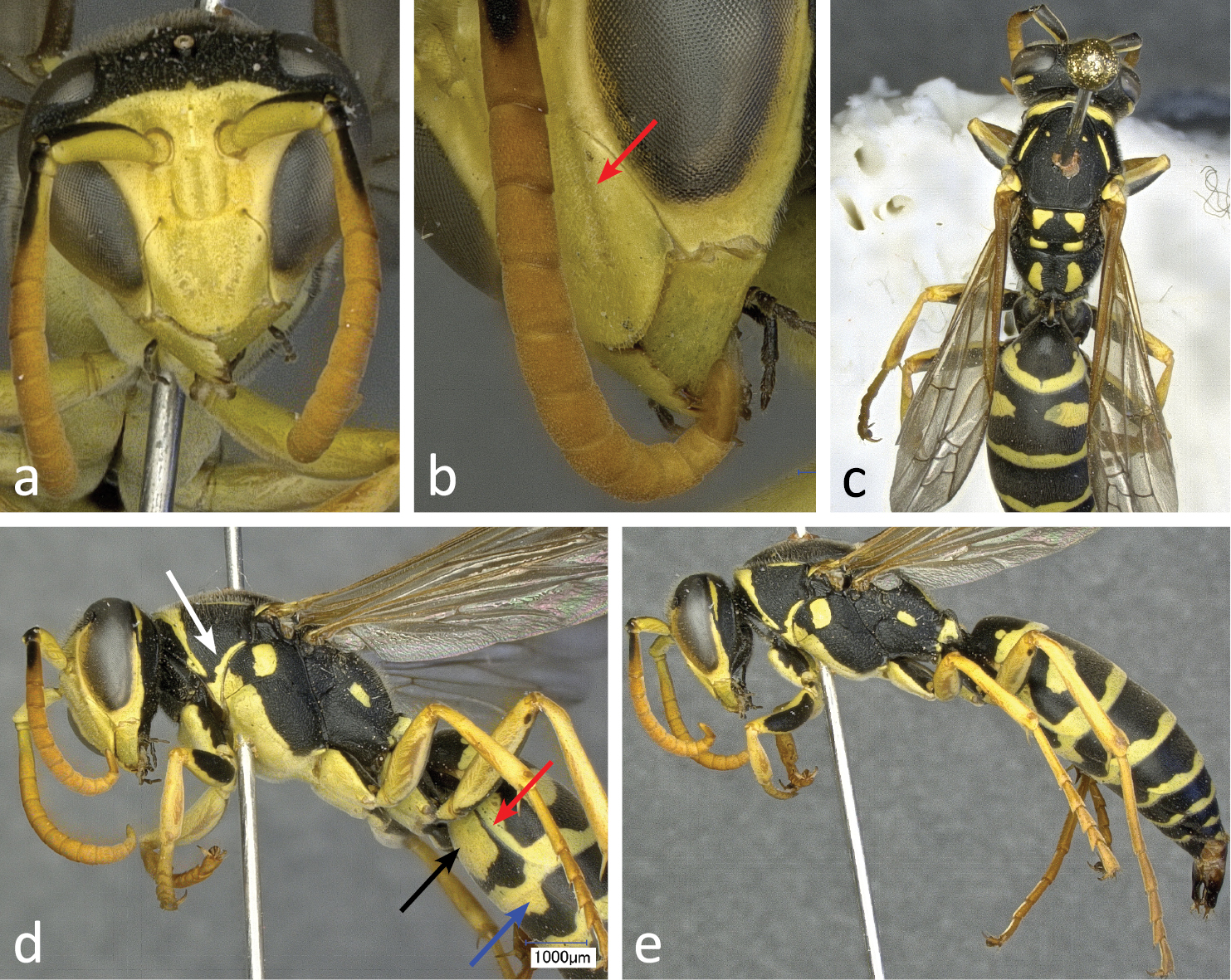
P. bischoffi, male. a: frontal view of head, b: lateral view of lower face, c: dorsal view of body, d: lateral view of head, mesosoma, and base of metasoma, e: lateral view of body

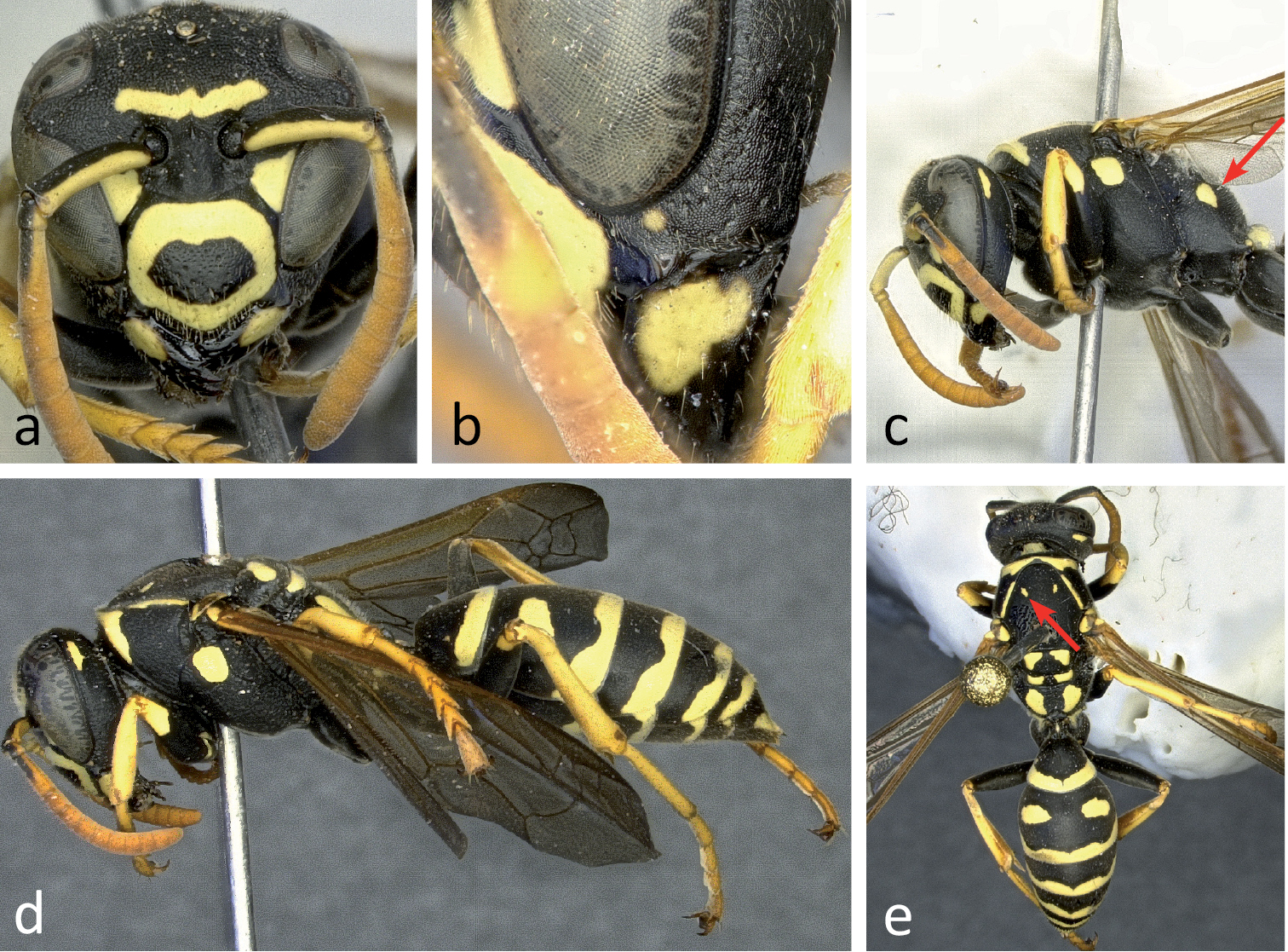
P. bischoffi, female. a: frontal view of head, b: lateral view of lower face, c: lateral view of head and mesosoma, d: lateral view of body, e: body from above

== Bibliography ==
- James M. Carpenter Phylogenetic Relationships among European Polistes and the Evolution of Social Parasitism (Hymenoptera: Vespidae, Polistinae)
- Rainer Neumeyer, Hannes Baur, Gaston-Denis Guex & Christophe Praz: A new species of the paper wasp genus Polistes (Hymenoptera, Vespidae, Polistinae) in Europe revealed by morphometrics and molecular analyses. ZooKeys 400: 67–118, doi:10.3897/zookeys.400.6611.
- Rolf Witt: Wespen beobachten, bestimmen. 1. Auflage. Naturbuch-Verlag, 1998, ISBN 3-89440-243-1
