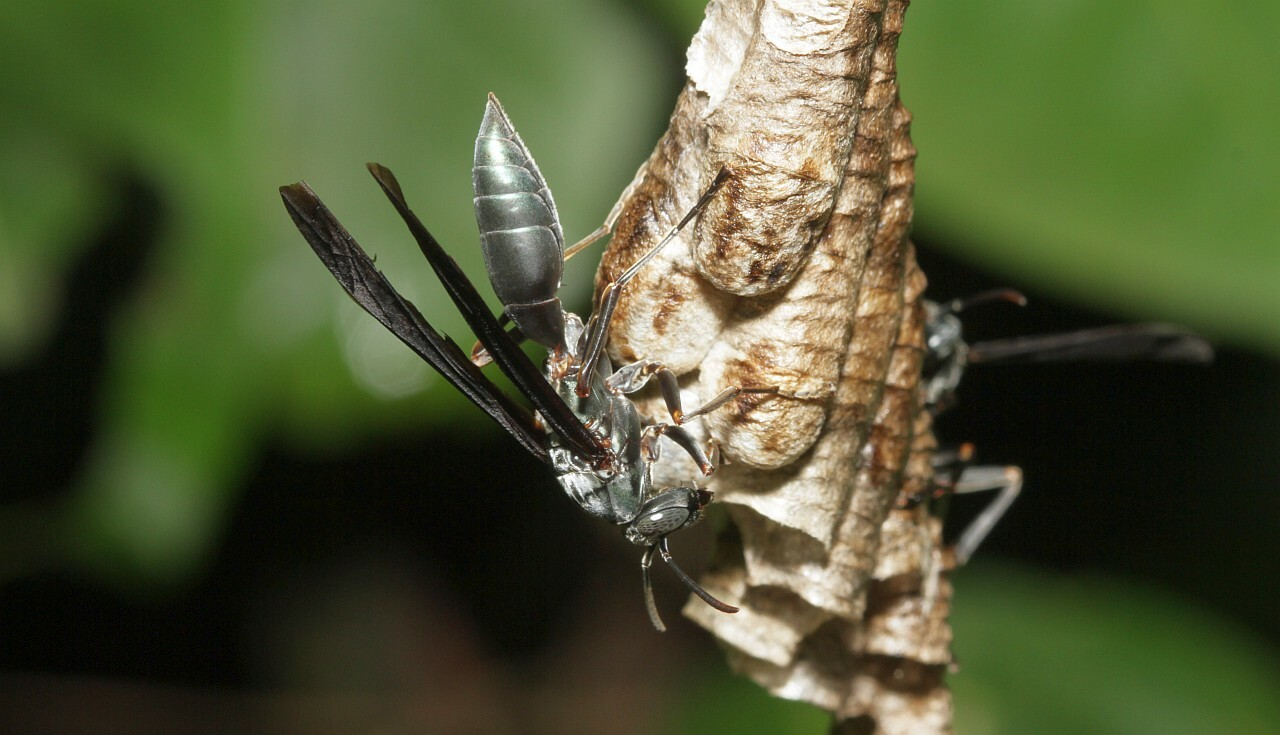
- Polistes goeldii photographed on a nest in Puerto Inca Province, Peru

Scientific classification
- Kingdom: Animalia
- Phylum: Arthropoda
- Class: Insecta
- Order: Hymenoptera
- Family: Vespidae
- Subfamily: Polistinae
- Genus: Polistes
- Species: P. goeldii

Binomial name
- Polistes goeldii Ducke, 1907

= Polistes goeldii =

Species of wasp

Polistes goeldii is a species of social paper wasp found in South America.

== Description and identification ==
The body of P. goeldii is blue-black, with some sutures and articulations redish, 18-20mm in length. The wings are black with black-brown venation.

The nest is distinct and similar to that of the Australian species Ropalidia revolutionalis, with the comb being only two cells wide and able to become very long.

== Distribution and habitat ==
The species has been recorded in Brazil, Colombia, Ecuador, El Salvador, Peru and Trinidad. The limited amount of specimens and sightings suggest that while this species is widespread, it is rare.

== Etymology ==
The species is named in honor of Émil Goeldi.
