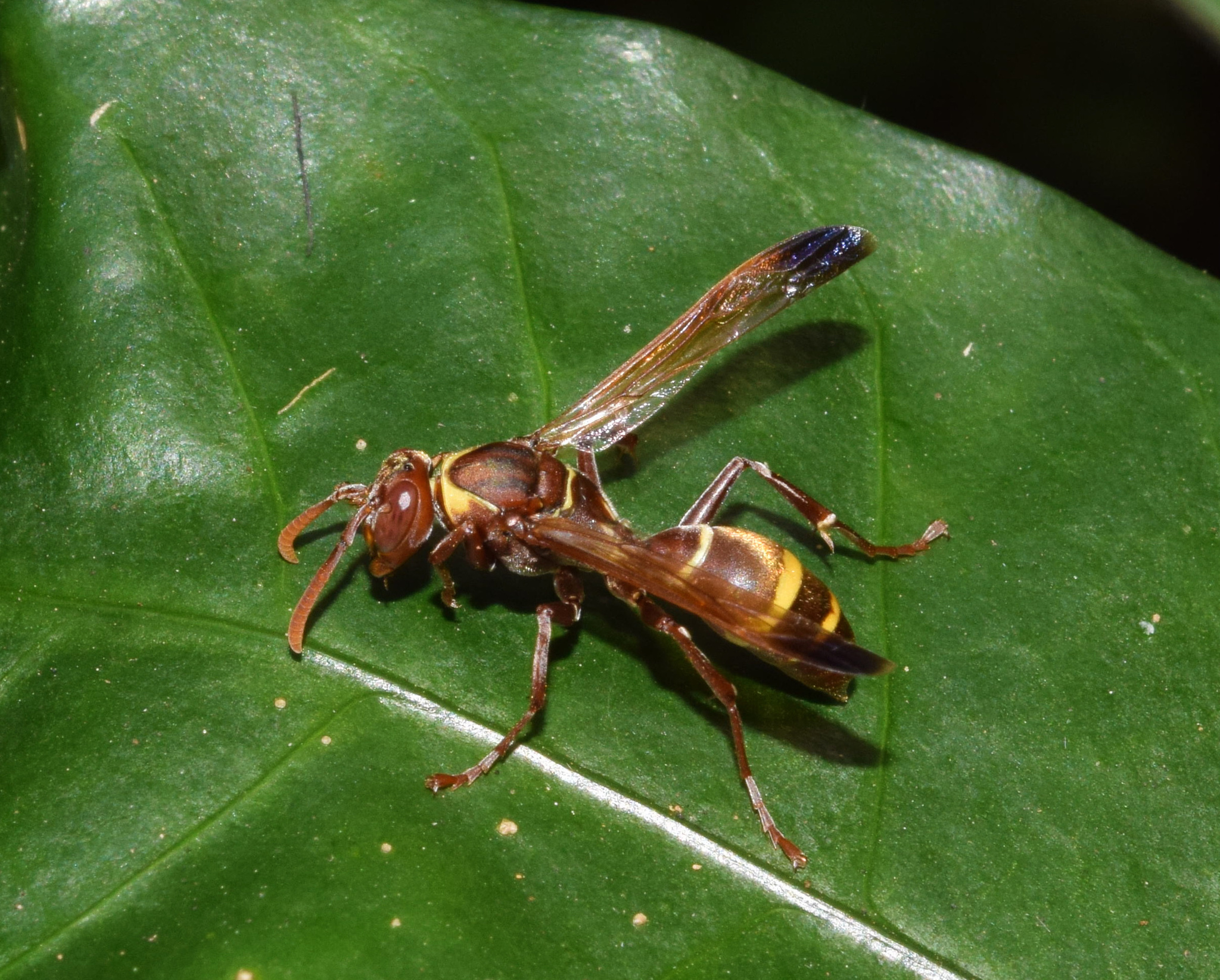

Scientific classification
- Kingdom: Animalia
- Phylum: Arthropoda
- Clade: Pancrustacea
- Class: Insecta
- Order: Hymenoptera
- Family: Vespidae
- Genus: Polistes
- Species: P. badius

Binomial name
- Polistes badius Gerst., 1873

= Polistes badius =

Species of wasp

Polistes badius is a species of social paper wasp from the subgenus Polistes found in Africa and Yemen.

== Description ==
The species was originally described by Carl Eduard Adolph Gerstaecker in 1873 as Polistes badia.

== Morphology ==
Polistes badius has a red-brown body with pale yellow bands on the thorax and abdomen and two thicker golden yellow bands on the abdomen. The body is covered in fine yellow hairs. The type specimen measured 13 millimetres (0.51 in).

== Distribution ==
Polistes badius specimens have been collected from Senegal, Sudan, Tanzania, Mozambique, Zimbabwe, south Africa, and Yemen.

== Ecology ==
Like other Polistes wasps, P. badius feeds primarily on caterpillars and other soft-bodied insects.

Polistes wasps construct nests composed of chewed plant pulp and salivary secretions. The nests of P. badius are horizontal with downward-facing cells.
