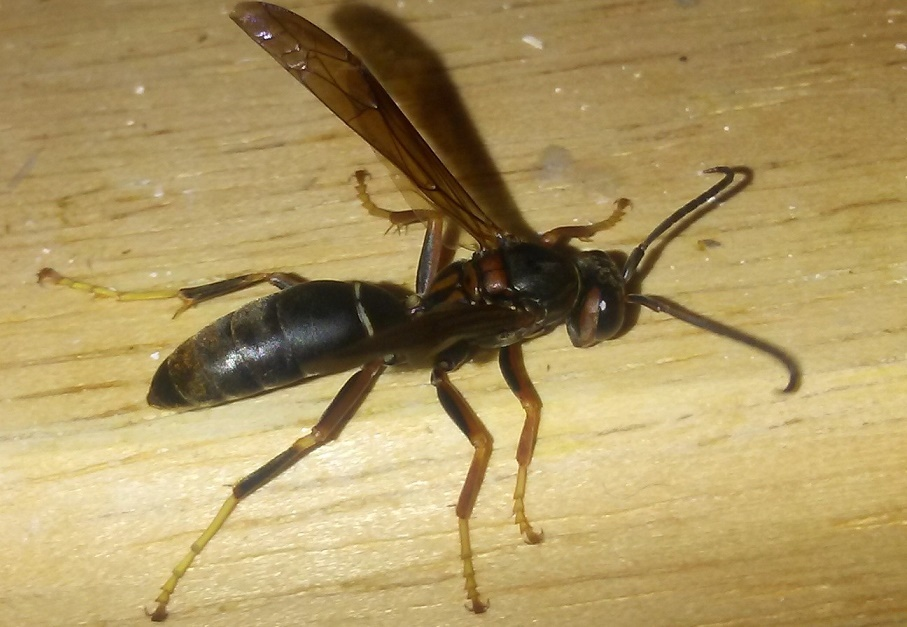

Scientific classification
- Domain: Eukaryota
- Kingdom: Animalia
- Phylum: Arthropoda
- Class: Insecta
- Order: Hymenoptera
- Family: Vespidae
- Subfamily: Polistinae
- Tribe: Polistini
- Genus: Polistes
- Species: P. parametricus

Binomial name
- Polistes parametricus Matthias Buck et al., 2012

= Polistes parametricus =

Species of wasp

Polistes parametricus is a species of paper wasp described in 2012. It was previously recognized as belonging in P. fuscatus-group (Polistes fuscatus, Polistes metricus, Polistes bellicosus). It is listed in the Identification Atlas of the Vespidae of the Northeastern Nearctic Region as "species B". And in the NCBI Taxonomy as Polistes sp. Buck2.

It is likely to be an obligate parasite of other social wasps, but no documented observation of this behavior have been made.
