= Polistes adelphus =

Scientific classification
- Domain: Eukaryota
- Kingdom: Animalia
- Phylum: Arthropoda
- Class: Insecta
- Order: Hymenoptera
- Family: Vespidae
- Subfamily: Polistinae
- Genus: Polistes
- Species: P. adelphus

Binomial name
- Polistes adelphus Richards, 1978

Species of wasp

Polistes adelphus is a species of paper wasp of the genus Polistes.
