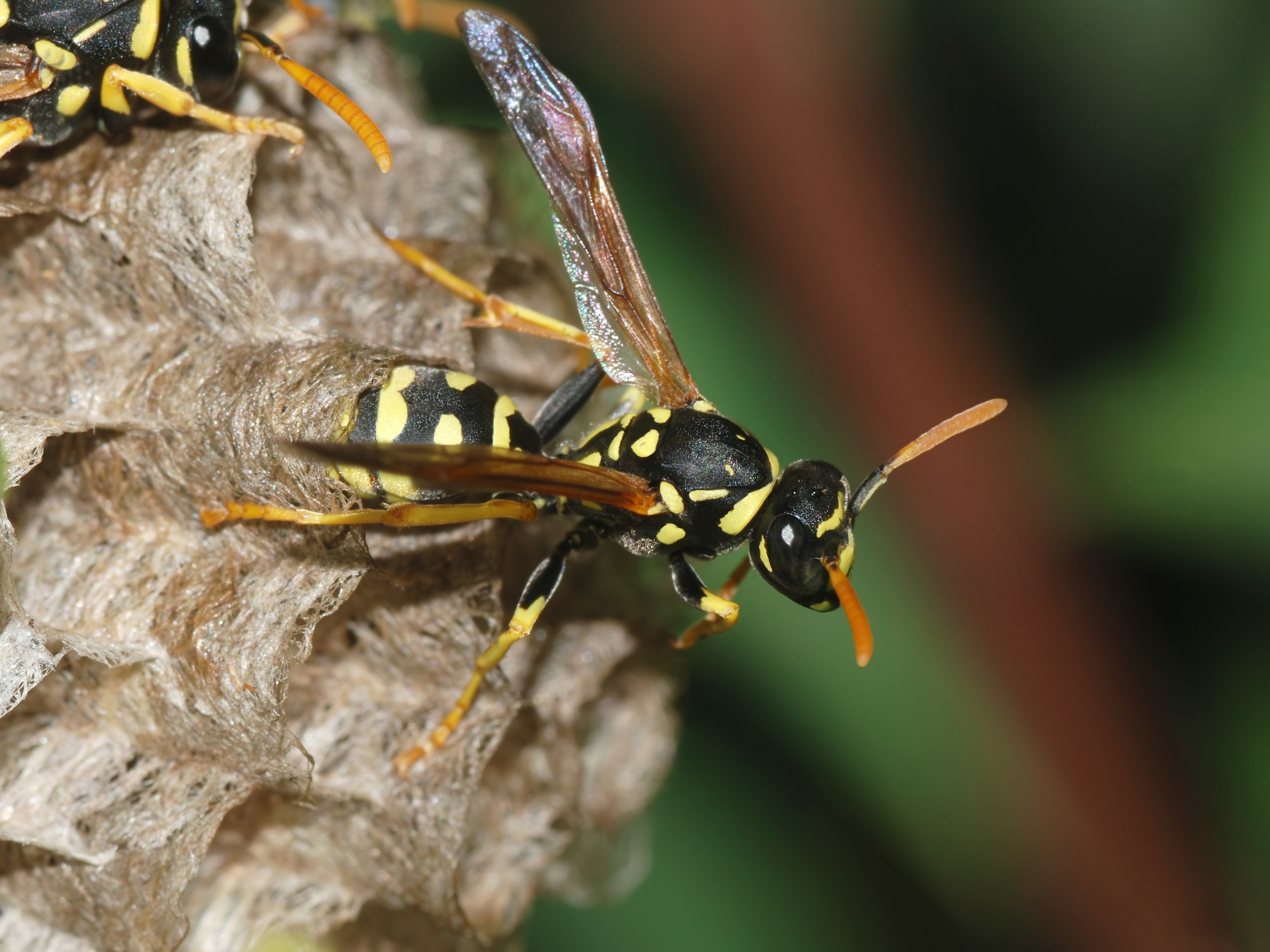
- Polistes gallicus

Scientific classification
- Kingdom: Animalia
- Phylum: Arthropoda
- Clade: Pancrustacea
- Class: Insecta
- Order: Hymenoptera
- Family: Vespidae
- Tribe: Polistini
- Genus: Polistes; Latreille, 1802

Type species
- Polistes gallicus Linnaeus, 1767

Synonyms
- Eupolistes Dalla Torre, 1904; Sulcopolistes Blüthgen, 1938; Polistula Weyrauch, 1939; Pseudopolistes Weyrauch, 1939; Leptopolistes Blüthgen, 1943

= Polistes =

Genus of wasps

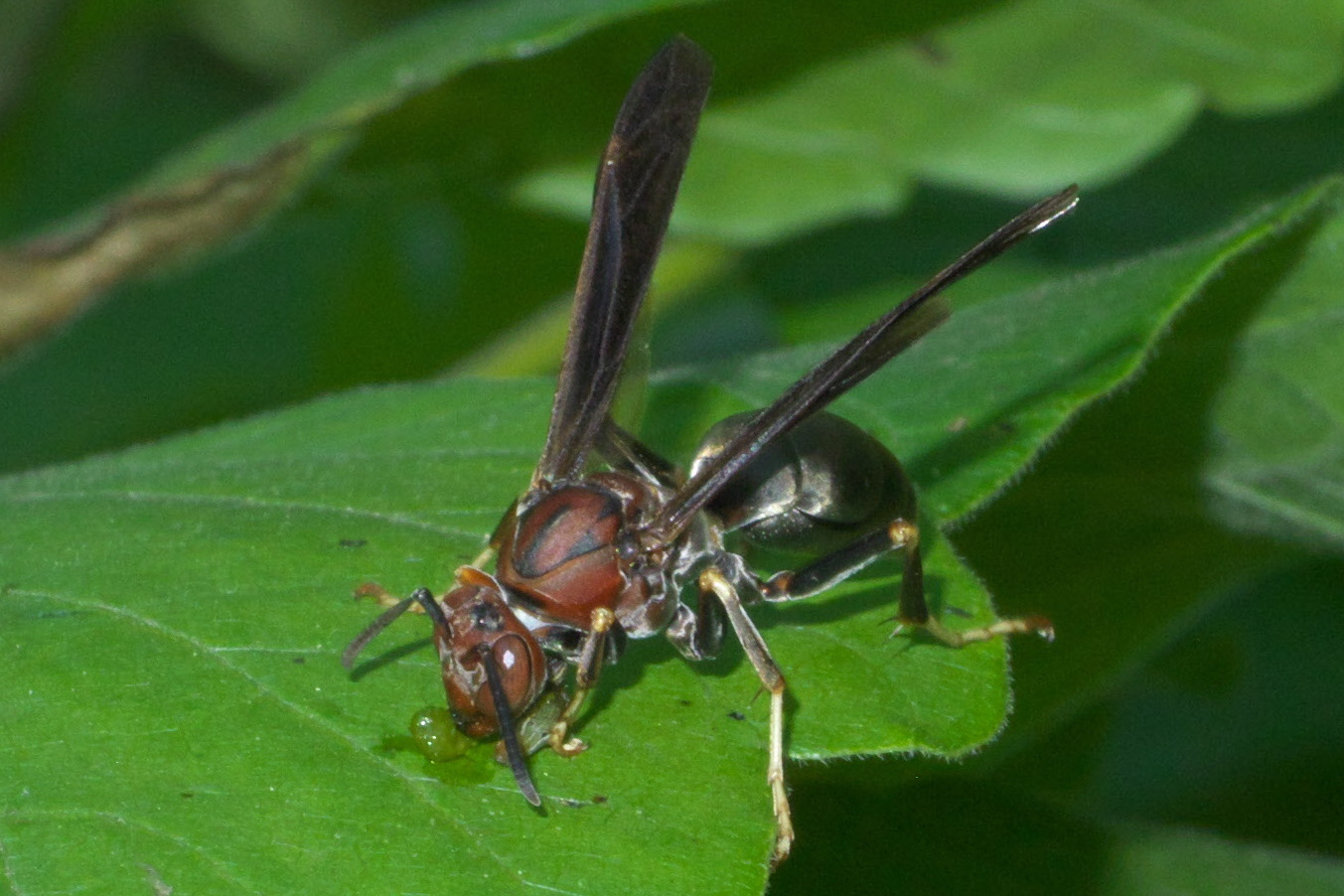
P. metricus, female

Polistes is a cosmopolitan genus of paper wasps and the only genus in the tribe Polistini. Vernacular names for the genus include umbrella wasps, coined by Walter Ebeling in 1975 to distinguish it from other types of paper wasp, in reference to the form of their nests, and umbrella paper wasps. Polistes is the single largest genus within the family Vespidae, with over 200 recognized species. Their innate preferences for nest-building sites leads them to commonly build nests on human habitation, where they can be very unwelcome; although generally not aggressive, they can be provoked into defending their nests. All species are predatory, and they may consume large numbers of caterpillars, in which respect they are generally considered beneficial.

== Description ==
As part of subfamily Polistinae, Polistes wasps are covered in short and inconspicuous hair, have a clypeus with a pointed apex, have a gena that is wide throughout, tergum 1 of the metasoma is almost straight to gently arched in profile, the tibia of the mid leg has two spurs, and the legs end in simple tarsal claws. The genus can be distinguished from other Polistinae by a sessile metasoma (the first segment at most slightly longer than wide) and the fourth tarsomeres of the mid and hind legs being symmetrical.

Polistes show sexual dimorphism, with males having seven externally visible metasomal segments whereas females have six. This trait is shared with other vespid wasps.

Polistes species have single-layered nests which are shaped like an umbrella, with the cells exposed to the air from the bottom, and no layer wrapping around the nest. The nests are suspended from a surface by a petiole and are constructed from a paper-like substance made of a mix of saliva and wood fibres chewed off old and soft wood or dead twigs. Many Polistes species in general often have nests supported by a longer petiole than those of Vespula.

== Biochemistry ==
Carlson et al 1998 finds the cuticular hydrocarbons of Polistes to be, similarly to many other insects, predominantly many-branched methyl branched alkanes. The reviews of Nelson 1978, Lockey 1988 and Nelson 1993 concur.

== Life cycle ==
The general life cycle of Polistes can be divided into four phases:

1. Founding (or pre-emergence) phase
2. Worker phase
3. Reproductive phase
4. Intermediate phase

=== Founding (or pre-emergence) phase ===
The founding stage begins in the spring when a solitary female (the "foundress") (or a small group of related females) initiates the construction of a nest. The wasps begin by fashioning a petiole, a short stalk which will connect the new nest to a substrate (often the eave of a house or outbuilding), and building a single brood cell at the end of it. Further cells are added laterally in a hexagonal pattern, each cell surrounded by six others. Although nests can achieve impressive sizes, they almost always maintain a basic shape: petiolated (stellocyttarous), single-combed, unprotected, and open (gymnodomous).

Eggs are laid by the foundress directly into the brood cells and are guarded by the foundress and the assisting females (if present). After the first larvae hatch, the foundress feeds them via progressive provisioning, bringing softened caterpillar flesh to the larvae multiple times throughout their development (as opposed to the one-time provisioning seen in some other hymenopteran groups). Each of this first seasonal brood of new paper wasps is exclusively female and destined to a subordinate worker position inside the nest; they do not found their own nests and instead assist their mother in the care and maintenance of future sisters.

Some foundress wasps do not build their own nests, but rather attempt to usurp that of another female. These usurpation attempts may or may not be successful, but almost always result in impressive displays of aggression and violence. Females may also adopt a more peaceful alternative reproduction strategy by joining the nest of a close relative (usually a sister) and working as assisting females. In the latter case, such cofounding females are generally, but not exclusively, close relatives.

=== Worker phase ===
The worker phase usually begins in the early summer, roughly two months after colony initiation, with the emergence of the first workers. These new females take up most of the colony's work duties, foraging, caring for brood, and maintaining the structure of the nest. Around this time, those females which assisted in nest foundation (if present) are driven from the nest by aggressive behavior on the part of the foundress, and leave either to start their own late-season nests or usurp another's.

=== Reproductive phase ===
The reproductive phase of the colony begins when the first female reproductives (the gynes) emerge from their brood cells. These reproductives differ from their worker sisters by having increased levels of fat stores and cryoprotectant carbohydrate compounds (allowing them to survive the overwintering period). These reproductives contribute genes directly to the next generation, while their worker sisters normally pass along their genes indirectly.

=== Intermediate phase ===
Once male reproductives emerge and both males and females disperse from the natal nest for mating flights, the so-called intermediate phase begins. Brood care and foraging behavior decline and worker numbers drop as dying individuals are no longer replaced by new ones. Intracolonial aggression increases and the social cohesion of the nest declines. In temperate Polistes species, individuals (almost exclusively inseminated females) gather in groups of up to 50 individuals and seek a sheltered location (called a hibernaculum) in which to overwinter.

== Behavior ==
=== Kin selection ===
The reproductive behavior of Polistes wasps provided some of the first evidence for the mathematical biologist W. D. Hamilton's 1964 theory of kin selection. Hamilton showed that animals such as workers could be expected to provide assistance to relatives such as their queens according to the costs and benefits involved (K) and their degree of genetic relatedness (r), and gave the rule that now carries his name, K > 1/r. Early caution existed among researchers as to whether social insects could really assess their relatedness. Hamilton himself suggested an alternative possibility, namely that kin could become associated simply by "population viscosity" —that offspring tend not to disperse far from their birthplaces— and West-Eberhard (1969) found some evidence for this in Polistes. However, Polistes species are now known to learn and remember chemical signals (hydrocarbons) picked up from the nest to distinguish nestmates accurately from non-relatives.

=== Dominance hierarchy system ===
Morphologically, the foundress and subordinate reproductive members of the colony differ little. However, behavioral differentiation occurs among females both between and within generations. For example, in the species Polistes humilis the queen displays a "tail-wagging" behavior to assert her dominance over the worker class. Similarly, Polistes canadensis also possesses behavioral differentiation between the queen and her nestmates, with the queen often suppressing the aggressive behavior of subordinates through lateral abdominal vibrations and stroking. In contrast, unmated females are not aggressive. In Polistes exclamans queens have different amounts of glucose, fructose, and trehalose which lead to different cryoprotectant levels. This alters their survivability in different temperatures, increasing their odds of reproduction. Females in P. bellicosus are also morphologically similar between caste separations. For example, a P. bellicosus worker could become queen, and egg-layer, if all of the original foundresses die or leave the nest. This is also true for Polistes dorsalis, which also displays dominant behavior. Despite having no distinct morphological caste, roles of P. dorsalis tend to be fixed in a system with division of labor.

=== Nestmate recognition ===
Polistes spp. discriminate colony mates using an acquired (i.e. learned) cue, absorbing hydrocarbons from the natal nest at eclosion. This cuticular hydrocarbon "signature" is derived both from the plant material and the foundress-applied substances from which the nest is made. Studies of Polistes fuscatus have researched the molecular basis of the recognition "pheromone" used by the wasps, and indicate at least some of the recognizable labels have the same chemical constituents as the adult cuticular hydrocarbons. Similar recognition is found in Polistes metricus. Dominant individuals of P. dominula have differing cuticular profiles from workers, and the frequent observations of the dominant female stroking its gaster across the nest surface, combined with its staying on the nest for longer times than subordinates, suggests the dominant individual may contribute more to the nest odor.

P. carolina females do not preferentially feed their own progeny (as larvae).

Further to this recognition of nestmates, Polistes biglumis foundresses discriminate between 'alien' eggs and their own via differential oophagy.

== Gallery ==
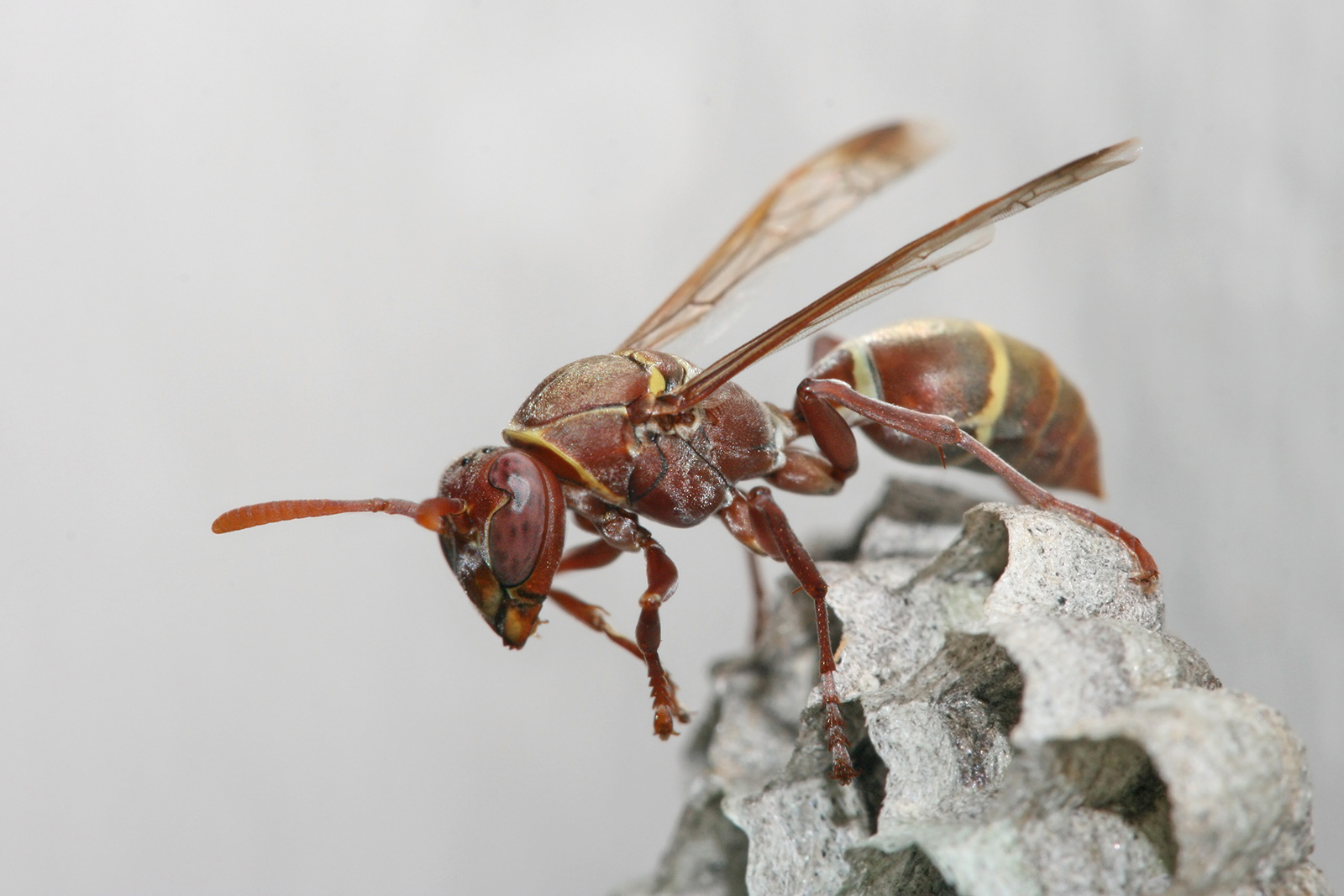
Polistes africanus wasp on a nest in Tanzania.

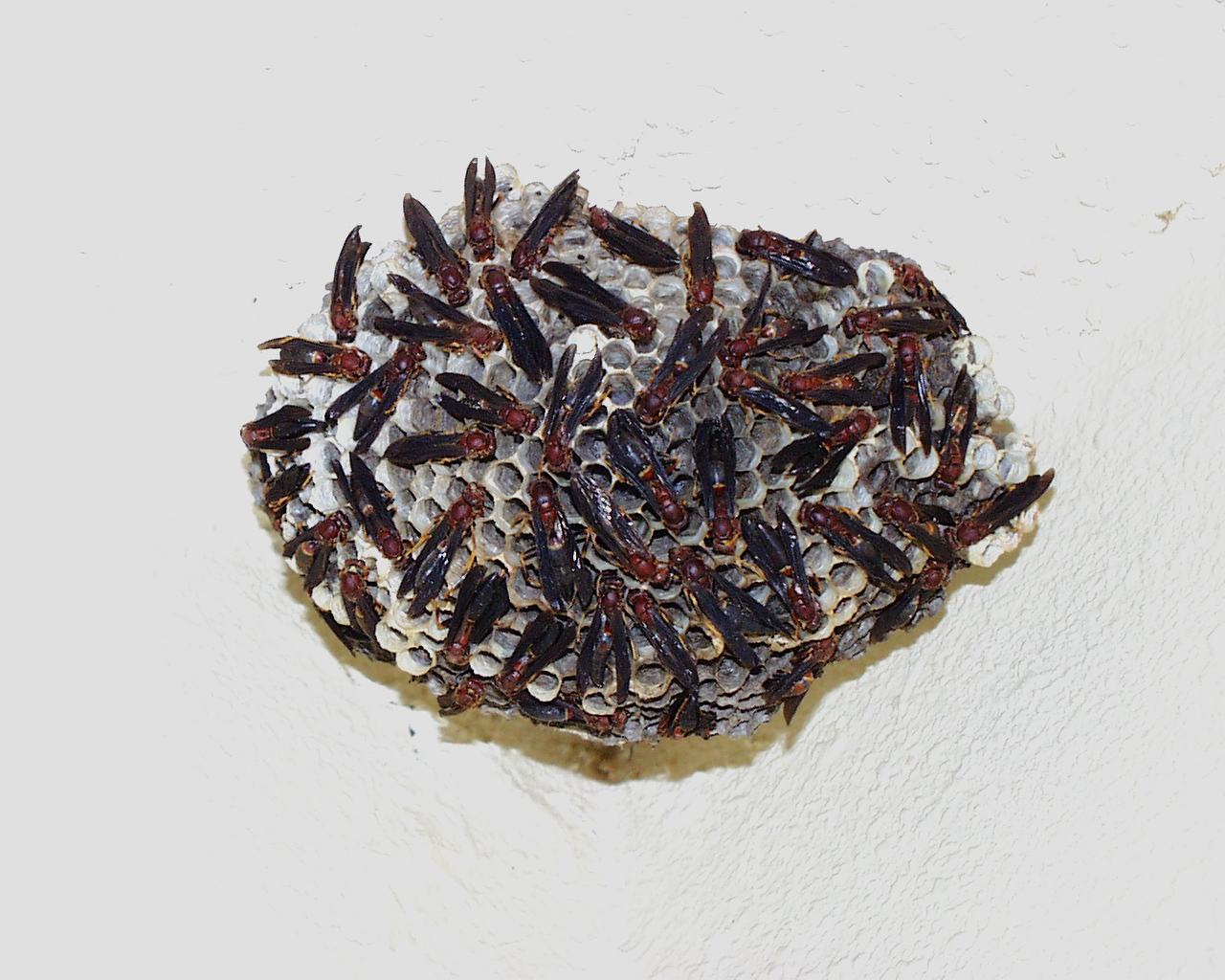
Polistes annularis (ringed paper wasp) nest in the United States.

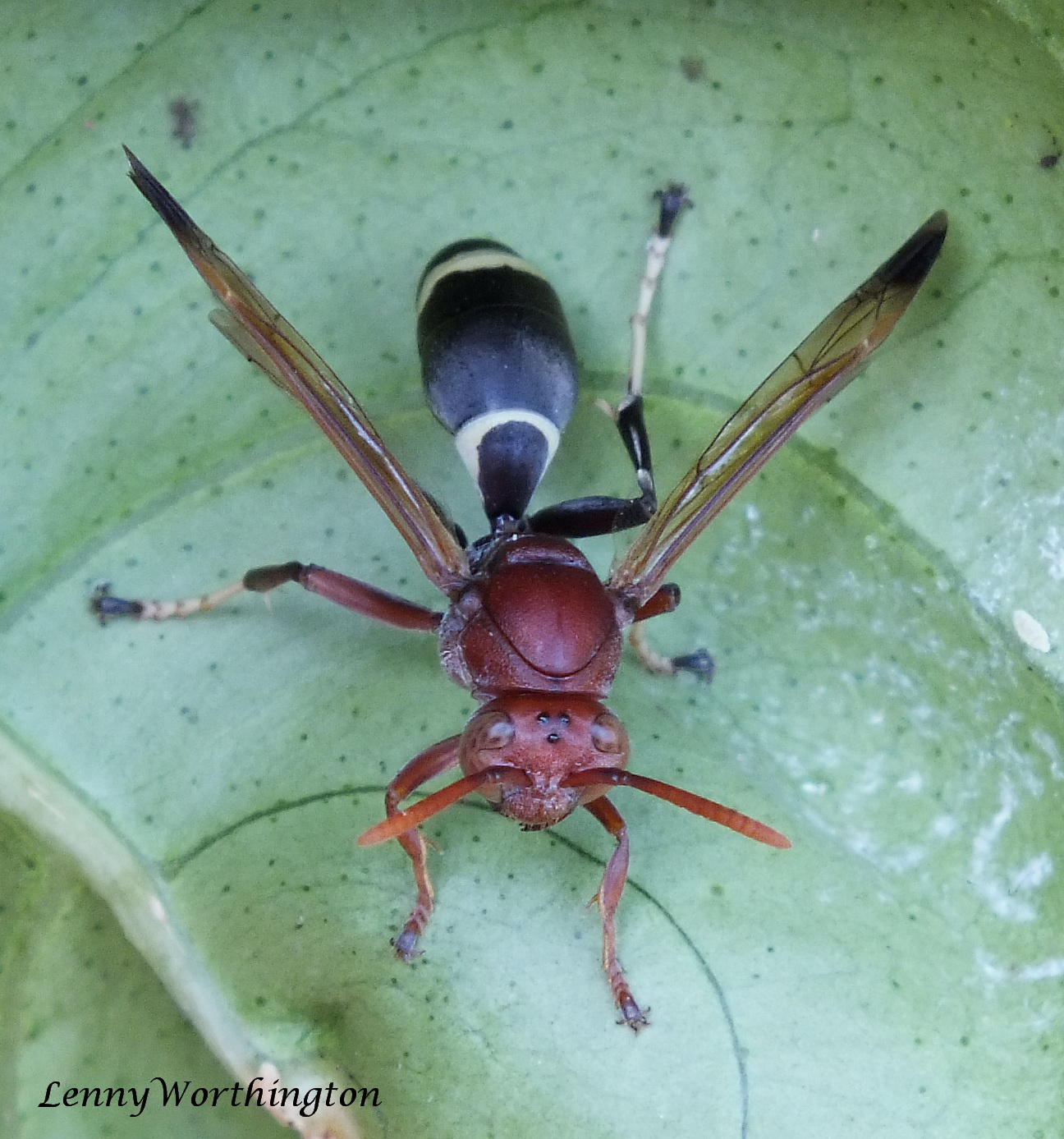
Polistes brunus in Thailand.

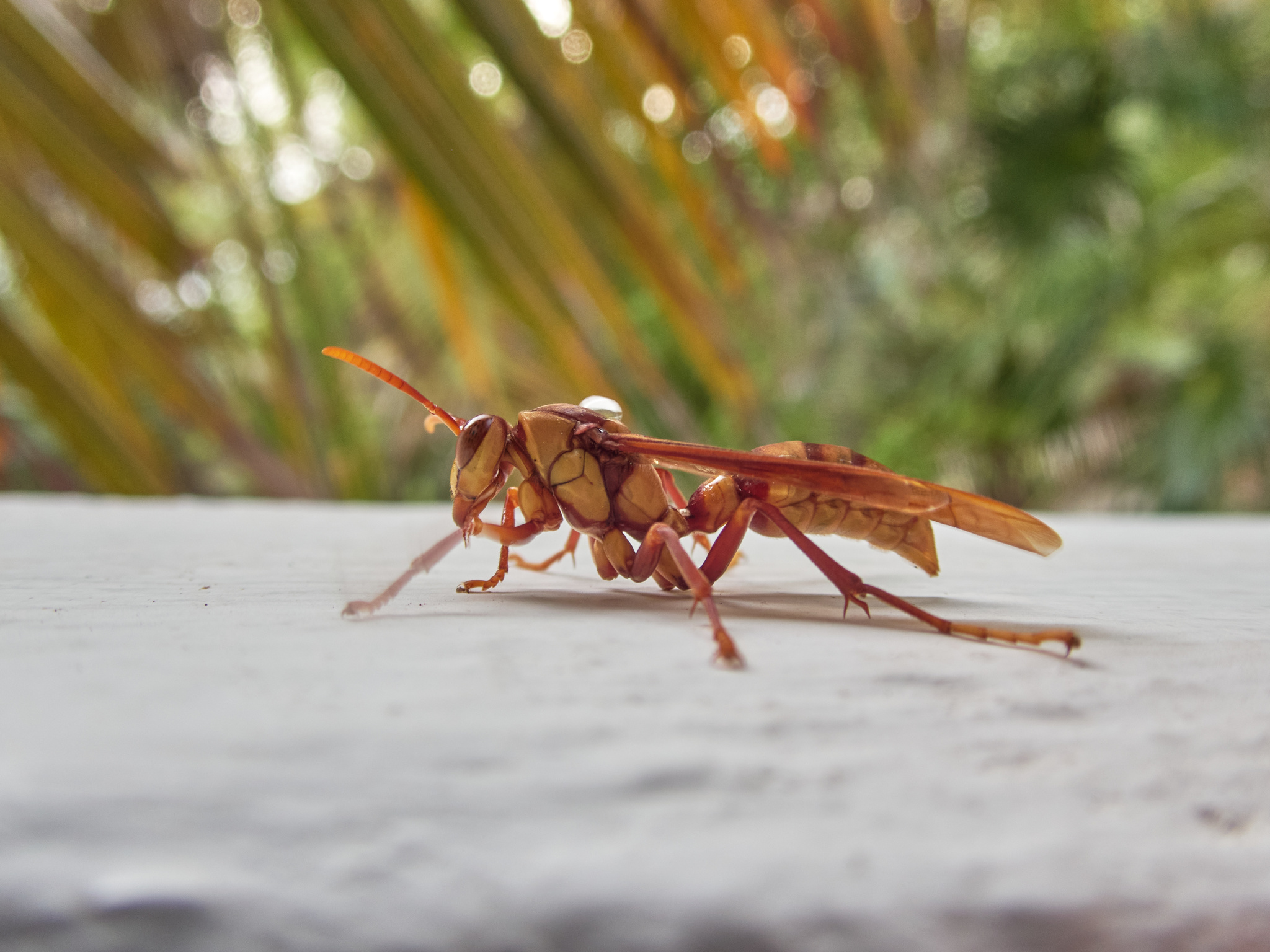
Polistes carnifex carnifex in Mexico.

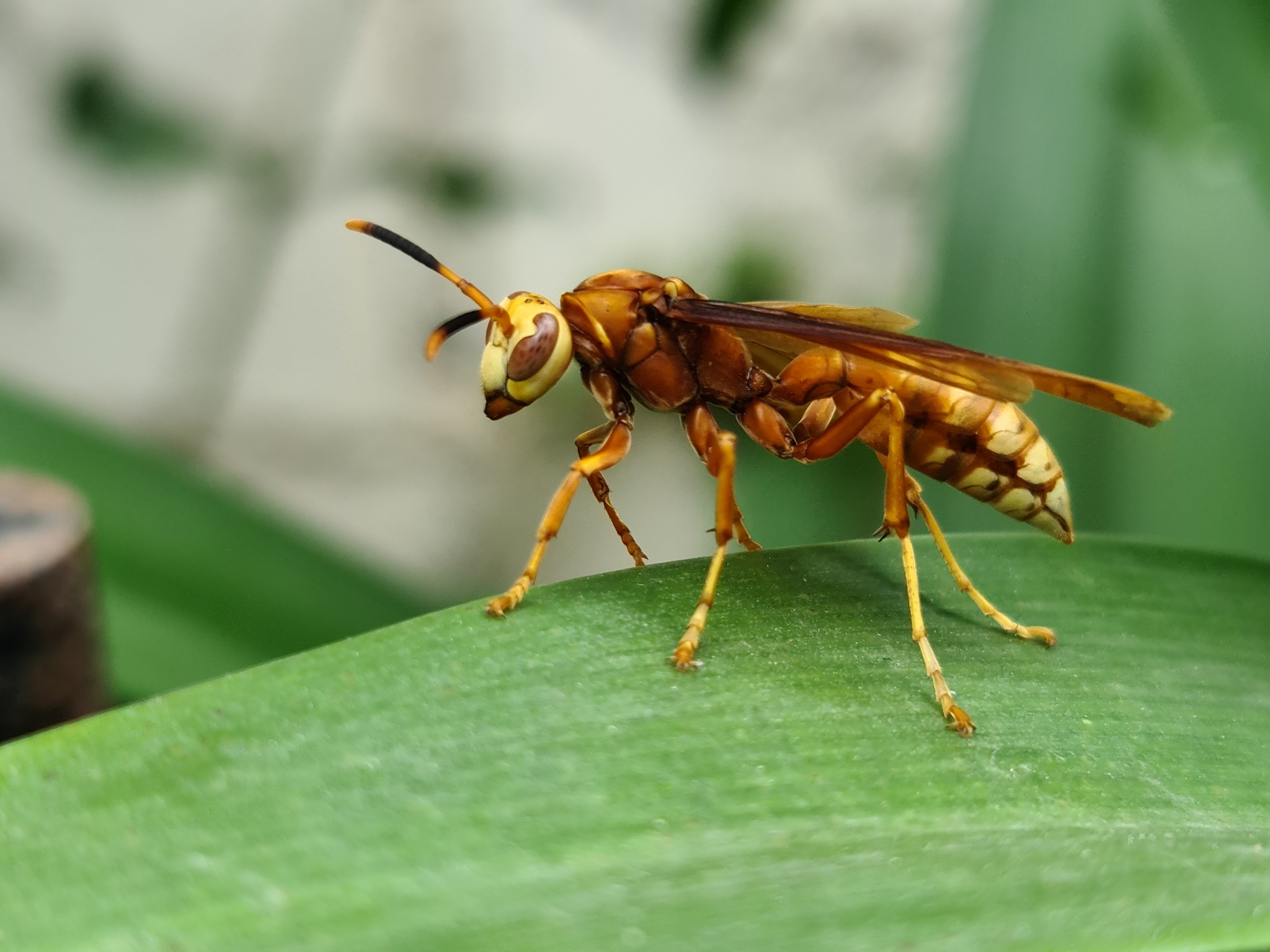
Polistes cavapyta in Brazil.

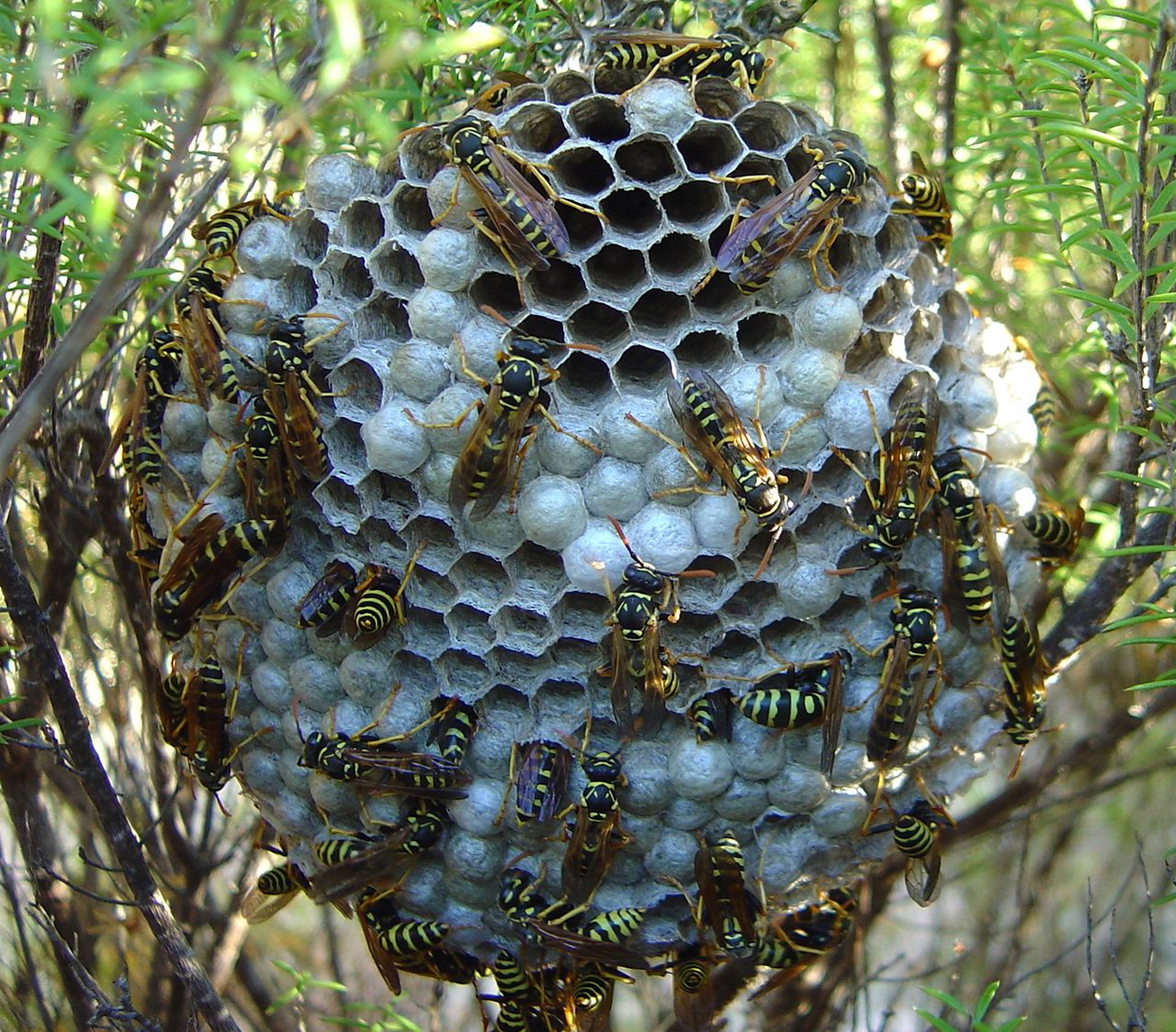
Polistes dominula (European paper wasp), invasive in Western Australia.

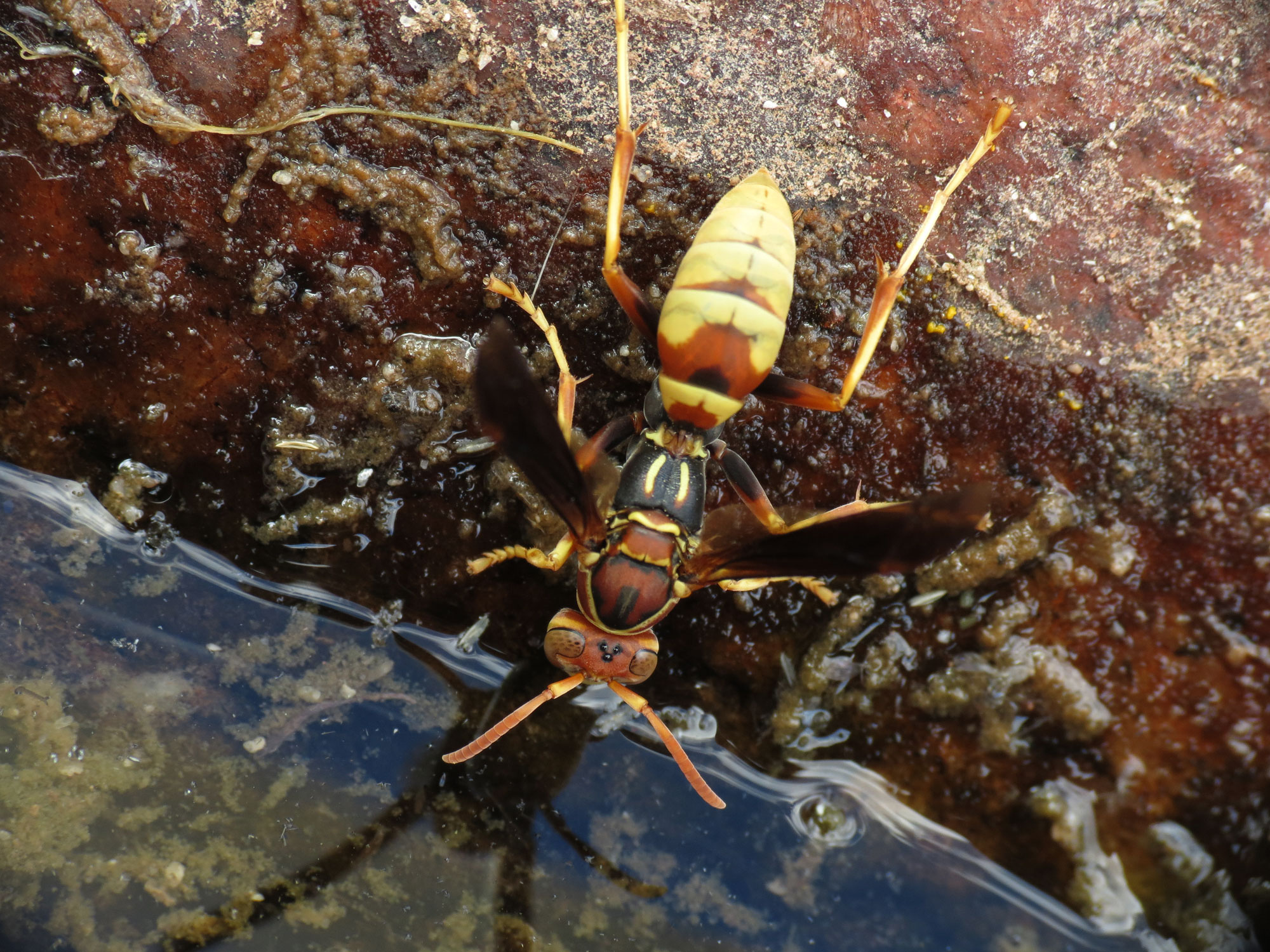
Polistes dorsalis neotropicus in Arizona.

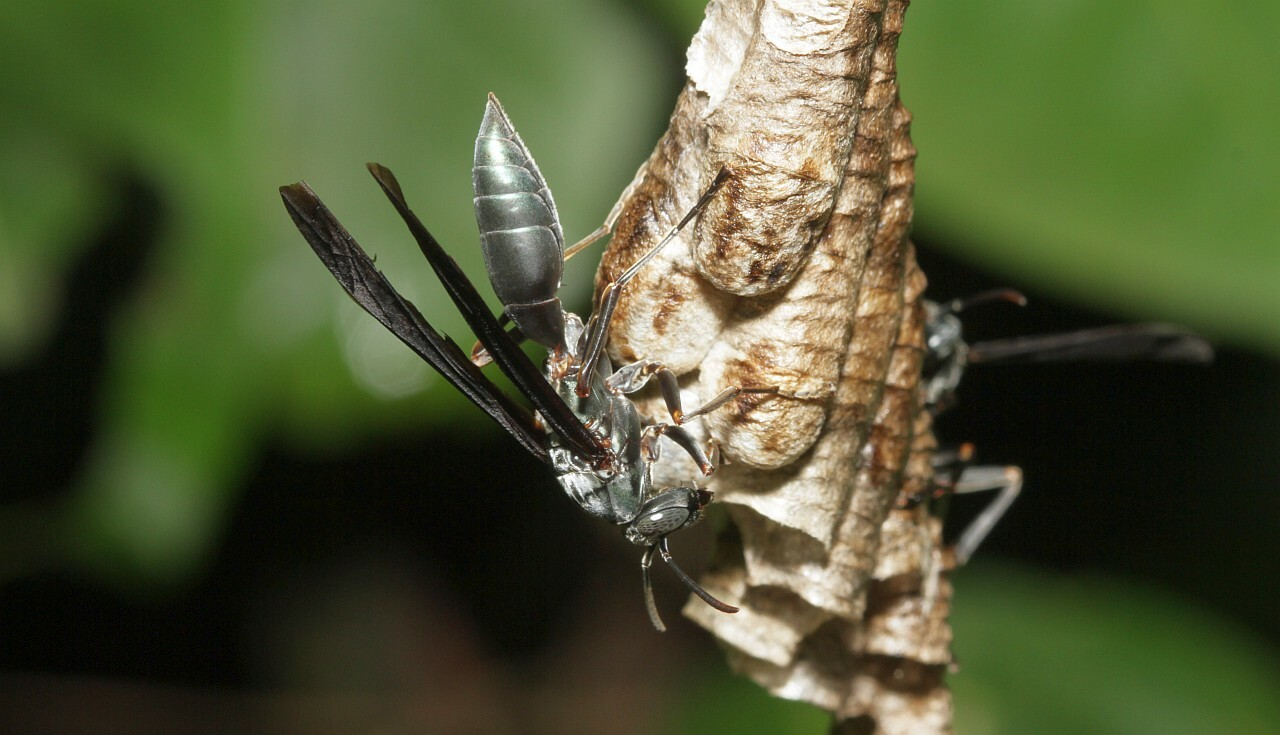
Polistes goeldii on a nest in Puerto Inca Province, Peru.

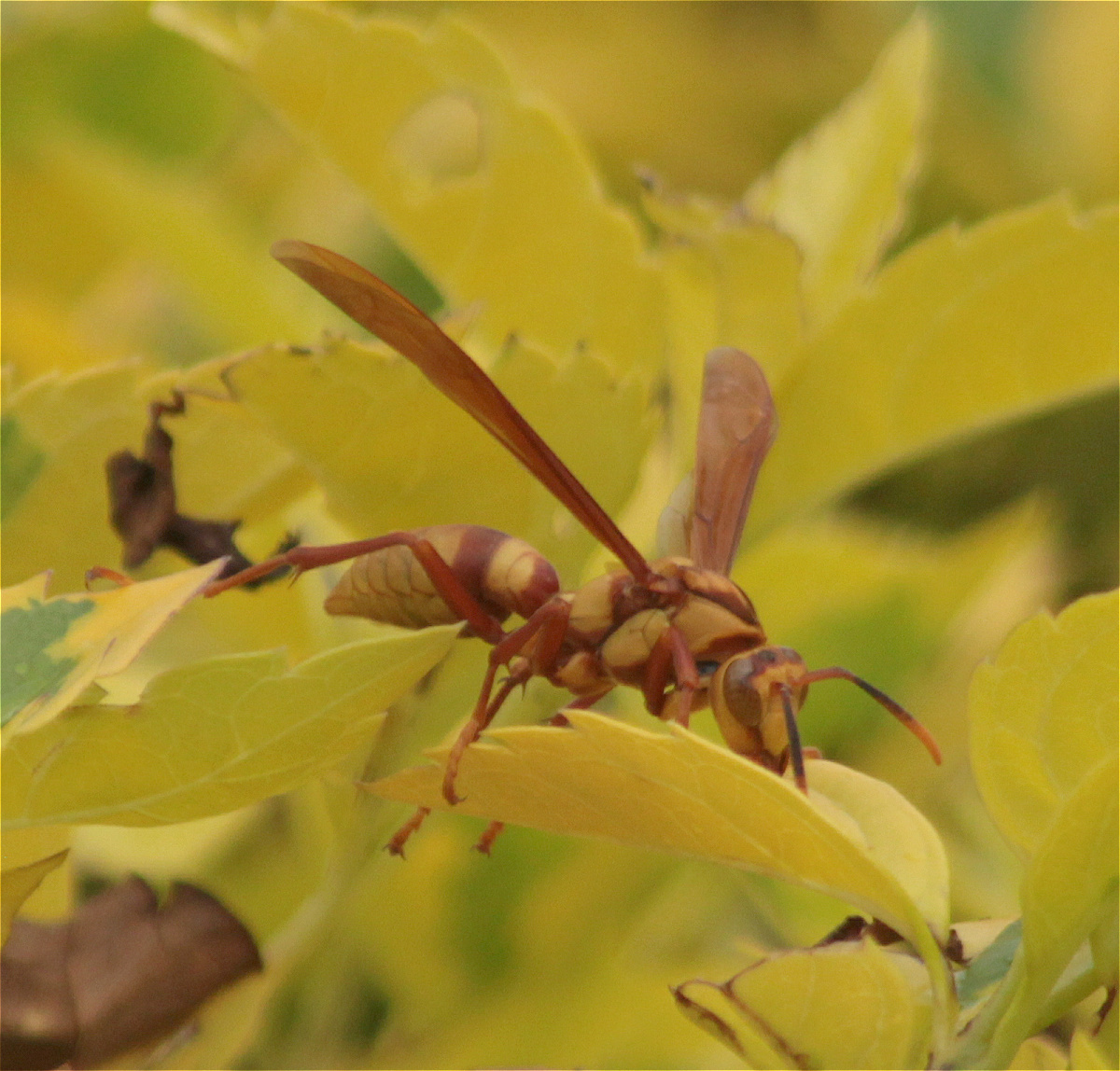
Polistes major colombianus in Colombia.

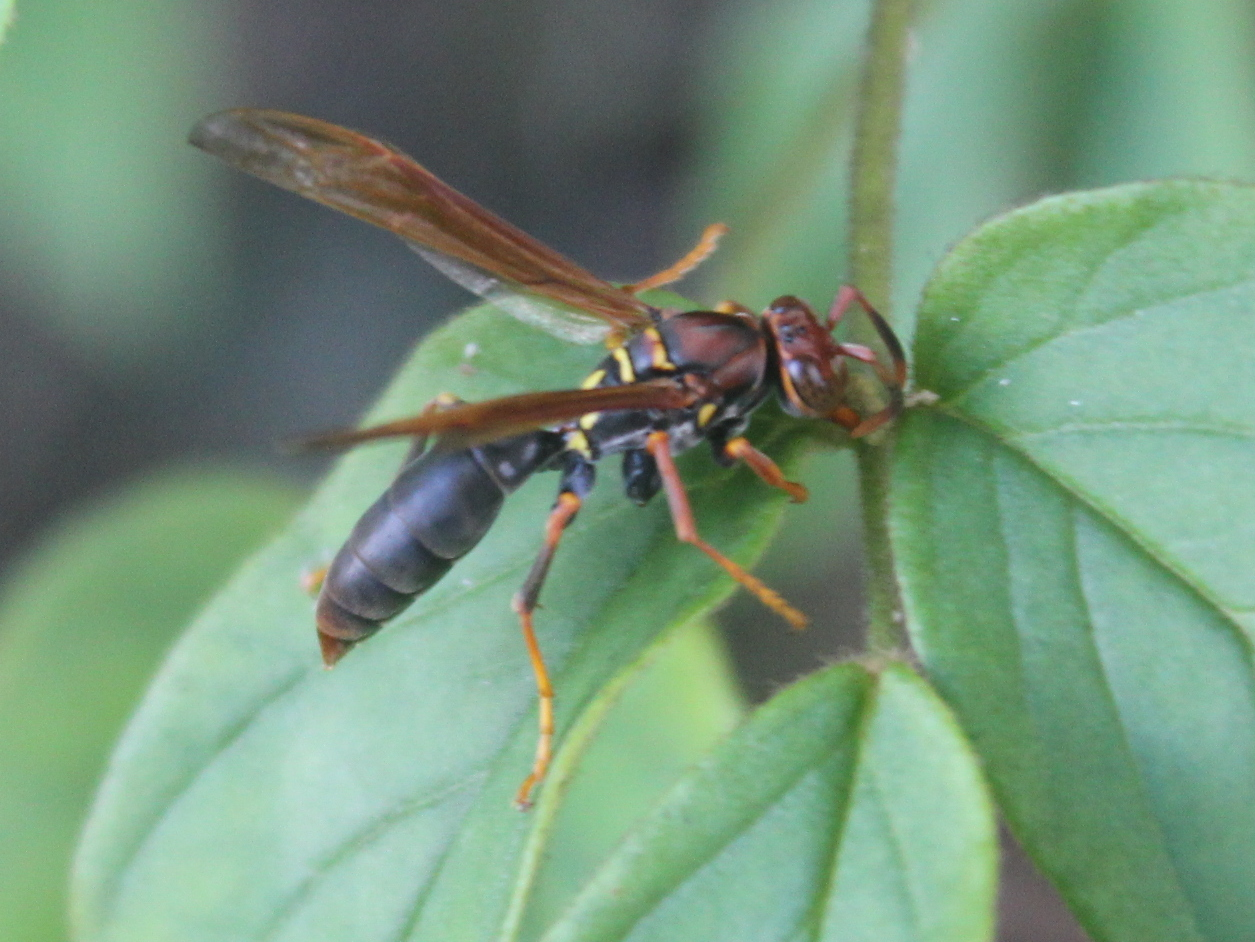
Polistes ridleyi, endemic to Fernando Noronha, Brazil.

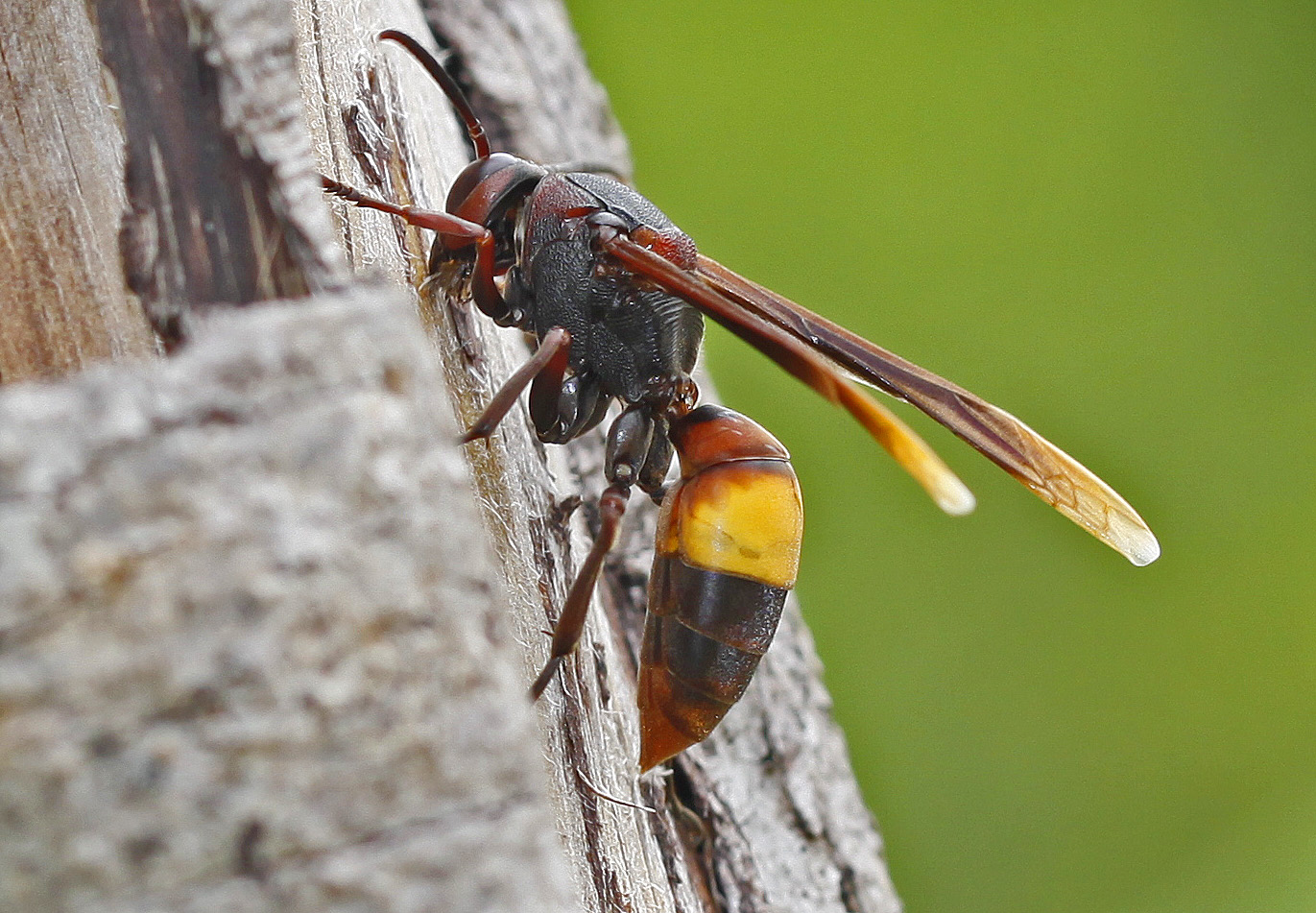
Polistes sagittarius in Cambodia.

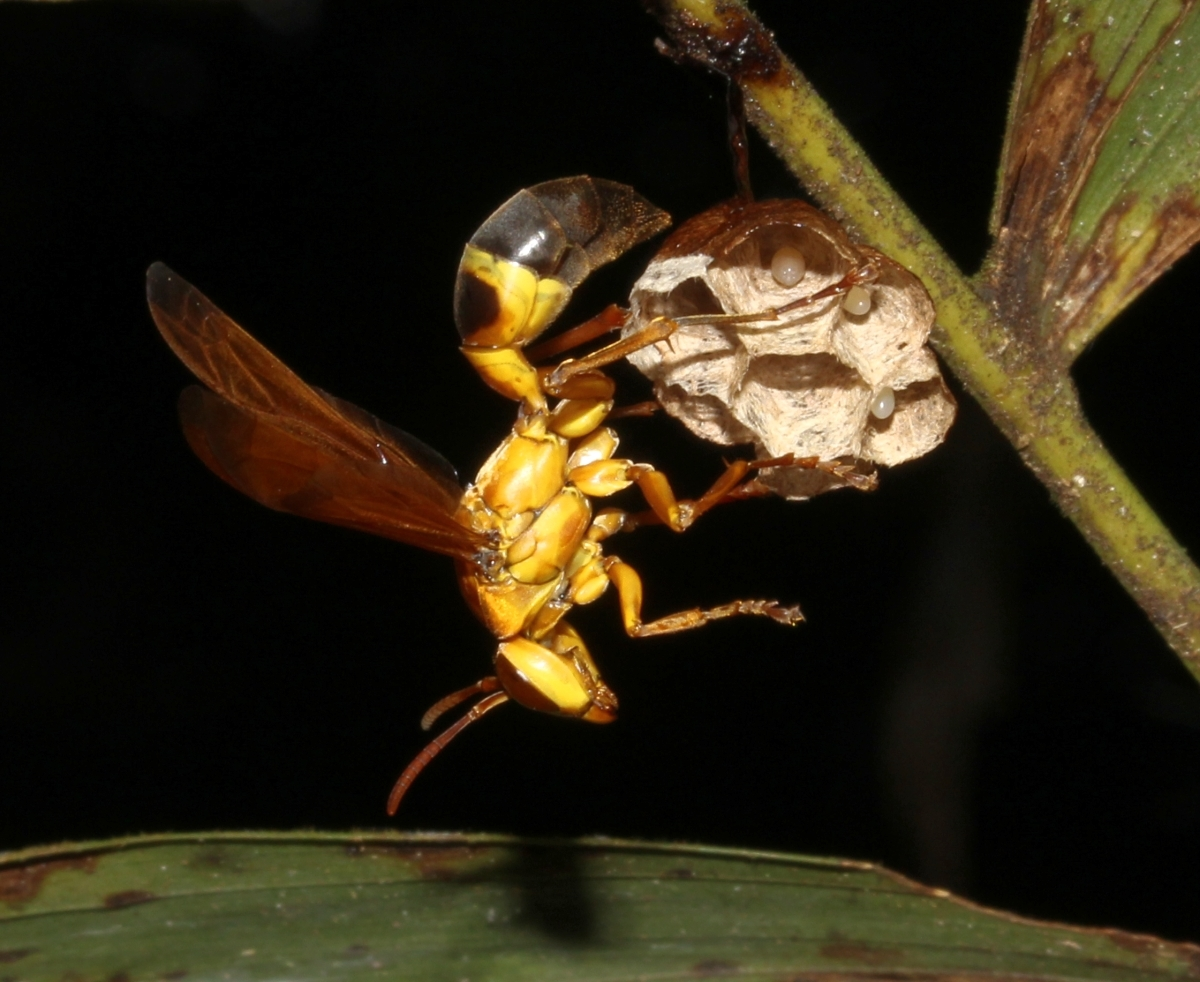
Polistes tescaceicolor in Peru.

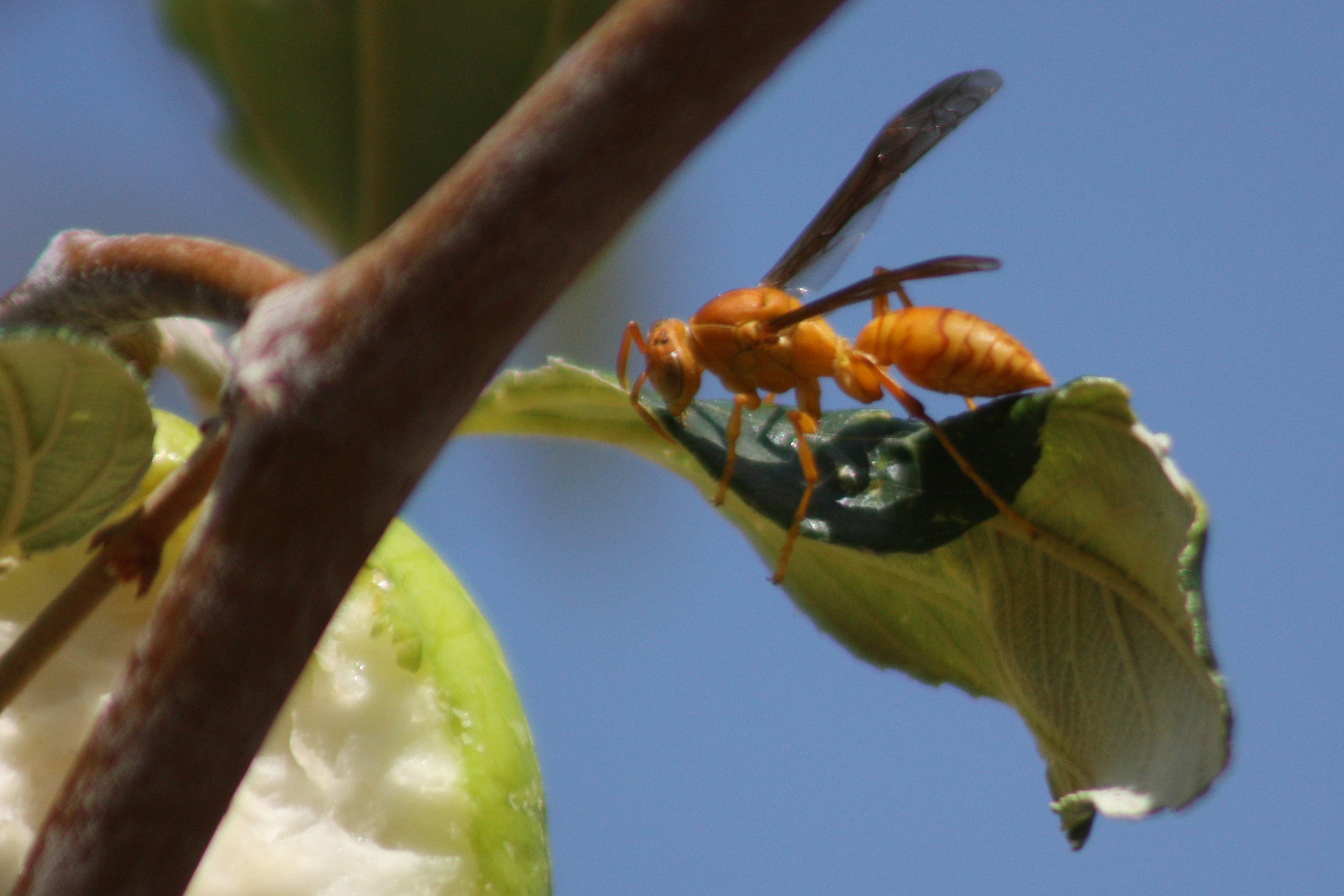
Polistes wattii in Musandam Peninsula, Oman.

A European paper wasp takes a monarch butterfly caterpillar from within a narrow leaf milkweed umbel. Part is shown at one-fourth speed.

A European paper wasp preying on Milkweed aphids which are on narrow leaf milkweed. Most scenes are repeated at one-fourth speed.

Single paper wasp foundress establishes her nest, adding cells, renewing repellent on the pedicle. She has already laid eggs in several of the incomplete cells and continually checks the nest and cells

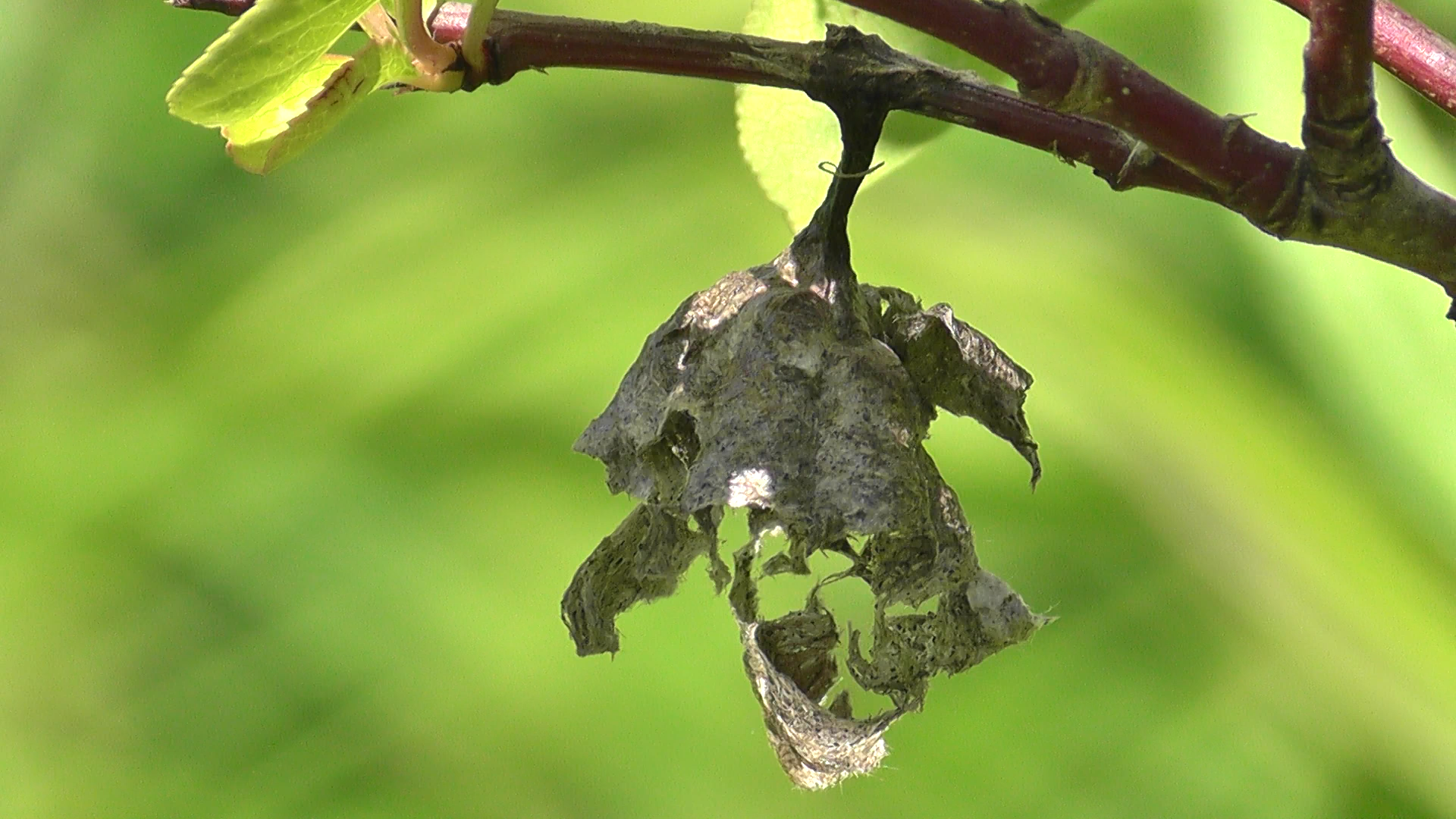
Foundress' nest raided by a rat, beetle or other predator. Nest was previously photographed eleven days earlier when there were five eggs. If the foundress survived, she would start a new nest at a different location

Worker adding additional material to expand nest

Water is brought to the nest for the larvae

Masticated caterpillar portion brought to nest and fed to the larvae

Wasps fanning the nest with their wings to provide breeze/cooling

Queen replacing an egg that was either not viable or laid by a worker

Wasps bring water to place in nest to provide cooling by evaporation

Paper wasps disturbed by hits to their nest support.

End of season: Male wasps mature and leave, nest shuts down leaving nest empty.

== Species ==
203 species were described in the genus by 1996, and new species continue to be described. There are nine species in Europe.

229 species and 125 subspecies are as follows:

- Polistes actaeon Haliday, 1836
- Polistes adelphus Richards, 1978
- Polistes adustus Bingham, 1897
- Polistes affinis Gusenleitner, 2006
- Polistes africanus Palisot de Beauvois, 1818
- Polistes albicinctus de Saussure, 1890
- Polistes albocalcaratus du Buysson, 1905
- Polistes angulinus Richards, 1951
- Polistes angusticlypeus Gusenleitner, 2006
- Polistes annularis (Linnaeus, 1763)
- Polistes apachus (de Saussure, 1857)
- Polistes apicalis de Saussure, 1858
- Polistes aquilinus du Buysson, 1905
- Polistes arizonensis Snelling, 1954
- Polistes arthuri Cameron, 1901
- Polistes assamensis Bingham, 1897
- Polistes associus Kohl, 1898
- Polistes asterope Cameron, 1901
  - Polistes asterope arvidi Petersen, 1990
  - Polistes asterope asterope Cameron, 1901
  - Polistes asterope narupi Petersen, 1990
- Polistes aterrimus de Saussure, 1853
- Polistes atrimandibularis Zimmermann, 1930
- Polistes atrox Richards, 1978
- Polistes aurifer de Saussure, 1853
- Polistes austroccidentalis Van Achterberg & Neumeyer, 2017
- Polistes badius Gerstaecker, 1871
- Polistes bahamensis Bequaert & Salt, 1931
- Polistes balder Kirby, 1888
- Polistes bambusae Richards, 1978
  - Polistes bambusae bambusae Richards, 1978
  - Polistes bambusae humboldti Richards, 1978
- Polistes bellicosus Cresson, 1872
- Polistes bequaertellus Snelling, 1983,
- Polistes bequaerti von Schulthess, 1921
- Polistes bequaertianus Willink, 1954
- Polistes bicolor Lepeletier, 1836
- Polistes biglumis (Linnaeus, 1758)
- Polistes biguttatus Haliday, 1836
- Polistes billardieri Fabricius, 1804
  - Polistes billardieri biglumoides Ducke, 1904
  - Polistes billardieri billardieri Fabricius, 1804
  - Polistes billardieri ruficornis de Saussure, 1853
- Polistes binotatus de Saussure, 1853
- Polistes bischoffi Weyrauch, 1937
- Polistes bituberculatus du Buysson, 1905
- Polistes boharti Snelling, 1983
- Polistes brevifissus Richards, 1978
- Polistes brunus Nguyen & Carpenter, 2017
- Polistes bucharensis Petersen, 1990
- Polistes buruensis Erichson, 184
- Polistes buyssoni Brèthes, 1909
- Polistes callimorphus de Saussure, 1853
- Polistes canadensis (Linnaeus, 1758)
  - Polistes canadensis borientalis Richards, 1978
  - Polistes canadensis canadensis (Linnaeus, 1758)
- Polistes candidoi von Ihering, 1903
- Polistes capnodes van der Vecht, 1972
  - Polistes capnodes capnodes van der Vecht, 1972
  - Polistes capnodes incomptus van der Vecht, 1972
  - Polistes capnodes quadrifasciatus van der Vecht, 1972
- Polistes carnifex (Fabricius, 1775)
  - Polistes carnifex boliviensis Bequaert, 1936
  - Polistes carnifex carnifex (Fabricius, 1775)
  - Polistes carnifex carnifex Latreille, 1817
- Polistes carolina (Linnaeus, 1767)
- Polistes cavapyta de Saussure, 1853
- Polistes cavapytiformis Richards, 1978
- Polistes celebensis Selis, 2018
- Polistes chinensis (Fabricius, 1793)
  - Polistes chinensis antennalis Pérez, 1905
  - Polistes chinensis chinensis (Fabricius, 1793)
- Polistes cinerascens de Saussure, 1854
- Polistes claripennis Ducke, 1904
- Polistes clavicornis van der Vecht, 1972
- Polistes comanchus de Saussure, 1857
  - Polistes comanchus comanchus de Saussure, 1857
  - Polistes comanchus navajoe Cresson, 1868
- Polistes communalis Nguyen, Vu, & Carpenter, 2017
- Polistes consobrinus de Saussure, 1858
- Polistes contrarius Cheesman, 1951
- Polistes crinitus (Felton, 1765)
  - Polistes crinitus americanus (Fabricius, 1775)
  - Polistes crinitus crinitus (Felton, 1765)
  - Polistes crinitus multicolor (Olivier, 1792)
- Polistes cubensis Lepeletier, 1836
- Polistes davillae Richards, 1978
- Polistes dawnae Dover & Rao, 1922
- Polistes deceptor Schulz, 1905
- Polistes defectivus Gerstaecker, 1871
- Polistes delhiensis Das & Gupta, 1984
- Polistes diabolicus de Saussure, 1853
- Polistes diakonovi Kostylev, 1940
- Polistes dominicus (Vallot, 1802)
- Polistes dominula (Christ, 1791)
- Polistes dorsalis (Fabricius, 1775)
  - Polistes dorsalis californicus Bohart, 1949
  - Polistes dorsalis clarionensis Bohart, 1949
  - Polistes dorsalis dorsalis (Fabricius, 1775)
  - Polistes dorsalis maritimus Bequaert, 1940
  - Polistes dorsalis neotropicus Bequaert, 1940
- Polistes ebsohinus Sonan, 1943
- Polistes eburneus Bequaert, 1943
- Polistes elegans Smith, 1859
- Polistes ellenbergi du Buysson, 1908
- Polistes ephippium Cameron, 1900
- Polistes erythrinus Holmgren, 1868
- Polistes erythrocephalus Latreille, 1813
- Polistes esperanzae Selis, 2018
- Polistes exclamans Viereck, 1906
- Polistes extraneus Kirby, 1883
- Polistes facilis de Saussure, 1853
- Polistes fastidiosus de Saussure, 1853
- Polistes ferreri de Saussure, 1853
- Polistes flavitarsis Selis, 2018
- Polistes flavobilineatus (Cameron, 1902)
- Polistes flavus Cresson, 1868
- Polistes foederatus Kohl, 1898
- Polistes fordi van der Vecht, 1972
- Polistes formosanus Sonan, 1927
- Polistes franciscanus Richards, 1978
- Polistes fuscatus (Fabricius, 1793)
- Polistes gallicus (Linnaeus, 1767)
- Polistes geminatus Fox, 1898
  - Polistes geminatus geminatus Fox, 1898
  - Polistes geminatus guyanensis Cameron, 1912
- Polistes gigas (Kirby, 1826)
- Polistes goeldii Ducke, 1904
- Polistes haugi du Buysson, 1906
- Polistes hebridensis Giordani Soika, 1981
  - Polistes hebridensis erromangensis Giordani Soika, 1981
  - Polistes hebridensis hebridensis Giordani Soika, 1981
  - Polistes hebridensis malekulensis Giordani Soika, 1981
  - Polistes hebridensis vilensis Giordani Soika, 1981
- Polistes helveticus Neumeyer, 2014
- Polistes hirsuticornis Buck, 2012
- Polistes horrendus Gusenleitner, 2006
- Polistes huacapistana Richards, 1978
- Polistes huisunensis Kuo, 1987
- Polistes humeralis Polašek, 2023
- Polistes humilis (Fabricius, 1781)
  - Polistes humilis centrocontinentalis Giordani Soika, 1975
  - Polistes humilis humilis (Fabricius, 1781)
  - Polistes humilis synoecus de Saussure, 1853
- Polistes incertus Cresson, 1865
- Polistes indicus Stolfa, 1934
- Polistes infuscatus Lepeletier, 1836
  - Polistes infuscatus anduzei Bequaert, 1943
  - Polistes infuscatus ecuadorius Richards, 1978
  - Polistes infuscatus infuscatus Lepeletier, 1836
  - Polistes infuscatus mariae Richards, 1978
  - Polistes infuscatus metensis Richards, 1978
- Polistes instabilis de Saussure, 1853
- Polistes intermedius Kojima, 1988
- Polistes iranus Guiglia, 1976
- Polistes japonicus de Saussure, 1858
- Polistes jokahamae Radoszkowski, 1887
- Polistes kaibabensis Hayward, 1932
- Polistes khasianus Cameron, 1900
- Polistes laevigatissimus Giordani Soika, 1975
- Polistes lanio (Fabricius, 1775)
  - Polistes lanio lanio (Fabricius, 1775)
  - Polistes lanio satanulus Bequaert, 1940
  - Polistes lanio weberi Bequaert, 1940
- Polistes lateritius Smith, 1857
- Polistes latinis Das & Gupta, 1984
- Polistes legnotus van der Vecht, 1972
- Polistes lepcha Cameron, 1900
- Polistes lineonotus Bohart, 1949
- Polistes loveridgei Bequaert, 1938
- Polistes lycus Cameron, 1901
- Polistes macrocephalus Bequaert, 1918
- Polistes madecassus de Saussure, 1853
- Polistes madiburensis von Schulthess, 1921
- Polistes major Palisot de Beauvois, 1818
  - Polistes major bonaccensis Bequaert, 1937
  - Polistes major castaneicolor Bequaert, 1936
  - Polistes major colombianus Bequaert, 1940
  - Polistes major major Palisot de Beauvois, 1818
  - Polistes major weyrauchi Bequaert, 1940
- Polistes mandarinus de Saussure, 1853
- Polistes maranonensis Willink, 1964
- Polistes marginalis (Fabricius, 1775)
  - Polistes marginalis baidoensis Giordani Soika, 1944
  - Polistes marginalis lindensis Giordani Soika, 1981
  - Polistes marginalis marginalis (Fabricius, 1775)
  - Polistes marginalis meruensis Giordani Soika, 1981
- Polistes maroccanus Schmid-Egger, 2017
- Polistes meadeanus von Schulthess, 1913
- Polistes melanopterus Cameron, 1911
- Polistes melanosoma de Saussure, 1853
- Polistes melanotus Richards, 1978
- Polistes mertoni du Buysson, 1913
- Polistes metricus Say, 1831
- Polistes mexicanus Bequaert, 1940
- Polistes minor Palisot de Beauvois, 1818
- Polistes mongolicus Buysson, 1911
- Polistes moraballi Richards, 1951
- Polistes myersi Bequaert, 1934
  - Polistes myersi curassavicus Richards, 1978
  - Polistes myersi myersi Bequaert, 1934
- Polistes mysteriosus Bequaert, 1938
- Polistes niger Brèthes, 1903
- Polistes nigrifrons Smith, 1859
  - Polistes nigrifrons nigrifrons Smith, 1859
  - Polistes nigrifrons obdurus Cheesman, 1951
  - Polistes nigrifrons stotherti Meade-Waldo, 1916
- Polistes nigritarsis Cameron, 1900
- Polistes nigrosericans Bequaert, 1940
- Polistes nimpha (Christ, 1791)
- Polistes ninabamba Richards, 1978
- Polistes nipponensis Pérez, 1905
- Polistes notatipes Richards, 1978
- Polistes obscurus de Saussure, 1863
- Polistes occipitalis Ducke, 1904
- Polistes occultus Kojima, 1988
- Polistes oculatus Smith, 1857
- Polistes olivaceus (DeGeer, 1773)
- Polistes opacus Gusenleitner, 2006
- Polistes ornatus Lepeletier, 1836
- Polistes pacificus Fabricius, 1804
- Polistes palmarum Bequaert, 1936
- Polistes paraguayensis Bertoni, 1921
- Polistes parametricus Buck, 2012
- Polistes penai Richards, 1978
- Polistes penthicus van der Vecht, 1972
  - Polistes penthicus ater Petersen, 1990
  - Polistes penthicus malaitensis van der Vecht, 1972
  - Polistes penthicus penthicus van der Vecht, 1972
- Polistes perflavus van der Vecht, 1972
- Polistes peruvianus Bequaert, 1934
- Polistes philippinensis de Saussure, 1853
- Polistes poeyi Lepeletier, 1836
  - Polistes poeyi haitiensis Bequaert and Salt, 1931
  - Polistes poeyi poeyi Lepeletier, 1836
- Polistes praenotatus Kohl, 1908
- Polistes pseudoculatus Snelling, 1955
- Polistes quadricingulatus Gusenleitner, 2006
- Polistes ridleyi Kirby, 1890
- Polistes riekii Richards, 1978
- Polistes riparius Yamane & Yamane, 1987
- Polistes rossi Bohart, 1949
- Polistes rothneyi Cameron, 1900
  - Polistes rothneyi carletoni van der Vecht, 1968
  - Polistes rothneyi engeli van der Vecht, 1968
  - Polistes rothneyi grahami van der Vecht, 1968
  - Polistes rothneyi gressitti van der Vecht, 1968
  - Polistes rothneyi hainanensis van der Vecht, 1968
  - Polistes rothneyi helvenacus van der Vecht, 1968
  - Polistes rothneyi ingrami van der Vecht, 1968
  - Polistes rothneyi iwatai van der Vecht, 1968
  - Polistes rothneyi koreanus van der Vecht, 1968
  - Polistes rothneyi krombeini van der Vecht, 1968
  - Polistes rothneyi quatei van der Vecht, 1968
  - Polistes rothneyi robinsoni van der Vecht, 1968
  - Polistes rothneyi rothneyi Cameron, 1900
  - Polistes rothneyi sikkimensis van der Vecht, 1968
  - Polistes rothneyi tibetanus van der Vecht, 1968
  - Polistes rothneyi vechti Das and Gupta, 1984
  - Polistes rothneyi rothneyi Matsumura, 1911
- Polistes rubellus Gusenleitner, 2006
- Polistes rubiginosus Lepeletier, 1836
- Polistes rufidens de Saussure, 1853
- Polistes rufiventris Ducke, 1904
- Polistes rufodorsalis Yamane & Kusigemati, 1985
- Polistes sagittarius de Saussure, 1853
- Polistes santoshae Das & Gupta, 1984
- Polistes satan Bequaert, 1940
- Polistes saussurei Dalla Torre, 1894
- Polistes schach (Fabricius, 1781)
- Polistes semenowi Morawitz, 1889
- Polistes semiflavus Holmgren, 1868
- Polistes sgarambus Giordani Soika, 1975
- Polistes shirakii Sonan, 1943
- Polistes sikorae de Saussure, 1900
- Polistes similis Das & Gupta, 1984
- Polistes simillimus Zikán, 1951
- Polistes simulatus Smith, 1860
  - Polistes simulatus halmaheirensis Petersen, 1990
  - Polistes simulatus morotaiensis Petersen, 1990
  - Polistes simulatus obiensis Petersen, 1990
  - Polistes simulatus simulatus Smith, 1860
- Polistes smithii de Saussure, 1853
  - Polistes smithii neavei von Schulthess, 1921
  - Polistes smithii smithii de Saussure, 1853
- Polistes snelleni de Saussure, 1862
- Polistes stabilinus Richards, 1978
- Polistes stenopus van der Vecht, 1972
  - Polistes stenopus brandti van der Vecht, 1972
  - Polistes stenopus ganonganus van der Vecht, 1972
  - Polistes stenopus manni van der Vecht, 1972
  - Polistes stenopus stenopus van der Vecht, 1972
- Polistes stigma (Fabricius, 1793)
  - Polistes stigma alagari Petersen, 1987
  - Polistes stigma bernardii Le Guillou, 1841
  - Polistes stigma dubius de Saussure, 1867
  - Polistes stigma galatheae Petersen, 1987
  - Polistes stigma goestai Petersen, 1987
  - Polistes stigma jani Petersen, 1987
  - Polistes stigma maculipennis de Saussure, 1853
  - Polistes stigma madsi Petersen, 1987
  - Polistes stigma manillensis de Saussure, 1853
  - Polistes stigma nebulosus Yamane & Kusigemati, 1985
  - Polistes stigma novarae de Saussure, 1867
  - Polistes stigma papuanus Schulz, 1905
  - Polistes stigma pouli Petersen, 1987
  - Polistes stigma sauiensis Petersen, 1987
  - Polistes stigma stigma (Fabricius, 1793)
  - Polistes stigma svendi Petersen, 1987
  - Polistes stigma tamulus (Fabricius, 1798)
  - Polistes stigma townsvillensis Giordani Soika, 1975
  - Polistes stigma tualensis Petersen, 1987
- Polistes strigosus Bequaert, 1940
  - Polistes strigosus atratus Das and Gupta, 1989
  - Polistes strigosus mimus Bequaert, 1940
  - Polistes strigosus strigosus Bequaert, 1940
- Polistes subsericeus de Saussure, 1854
- Polistes takasagonus Sonan, 1943
- Polistes tenebricosus Lepeletier, 1836
- Polistes tenebris Nguyen & Lee 2017
- Polistes tenellus du Buysson, 1905
  - Polistes tenellus lahejensis Giordani Soika, 1981
  - Polistes tenellus minutissimus Giordani Soika, 1981
  - Polistes tenellus tenellus du Buysson, 1905
- Polistes tenuipunctatus Selis, 2018
- Polistes tenuispunctia Kim, 2001
- Polistes tepidus (Fabricius, 1775)
  - Polistes tepidus batjanensis Cameron, 1911
  - Polistes tepidus malayanus Cameron, 1906
  - Polistes tepidus manusensis Petersen, 1990
  - Polistes tepidus picteti de Saussure, 1853
  - Polistes tepidus speciosus du Buysson, 1913
  - Polistes tepidus tepidus (Fabricius, 1775)
  - Polistes tepidus theodori Petersen, 1990
- Polistes testaceicolor Bequaert, 1937
- Polistes thoracicus Fox, 1898
- Polistes torresae Silveira, 1994
- Polistes tristis Meade-Waldo, 1911
- Polistes tullgreni Schulz, 1906
- Polistes utakwae Meade-Waldo, 1916
- Polistes variabilis (Fabricius, 1781)
- Polistes veracrucis Richards, 1978
- Polistes versicolor (Olivier, 1792)
  - Polistes versicolor flavoguttatus Bequaert, 1934
  - Polistes versicolor kaieteurensis Bequaert, 1934
  - Polistes versicolor versicolor (Olivier, 1792)
- Polistes wattii Cameron, 1900
- Polistes watutus Kojima, 1988
- Polistes weyrauchorum Willink, 1964
- Polistes williamsi Petersen, 1990
- Polistes xanthogaster Bequaert, 1940
  - Polistes xanthogaster willei Bequaert, 1940
  - Polistes xanthogaster xanthogaster Bequaert, 1940
- Polistes xantholeucus van der Vecht, 1984

== Pest status ==
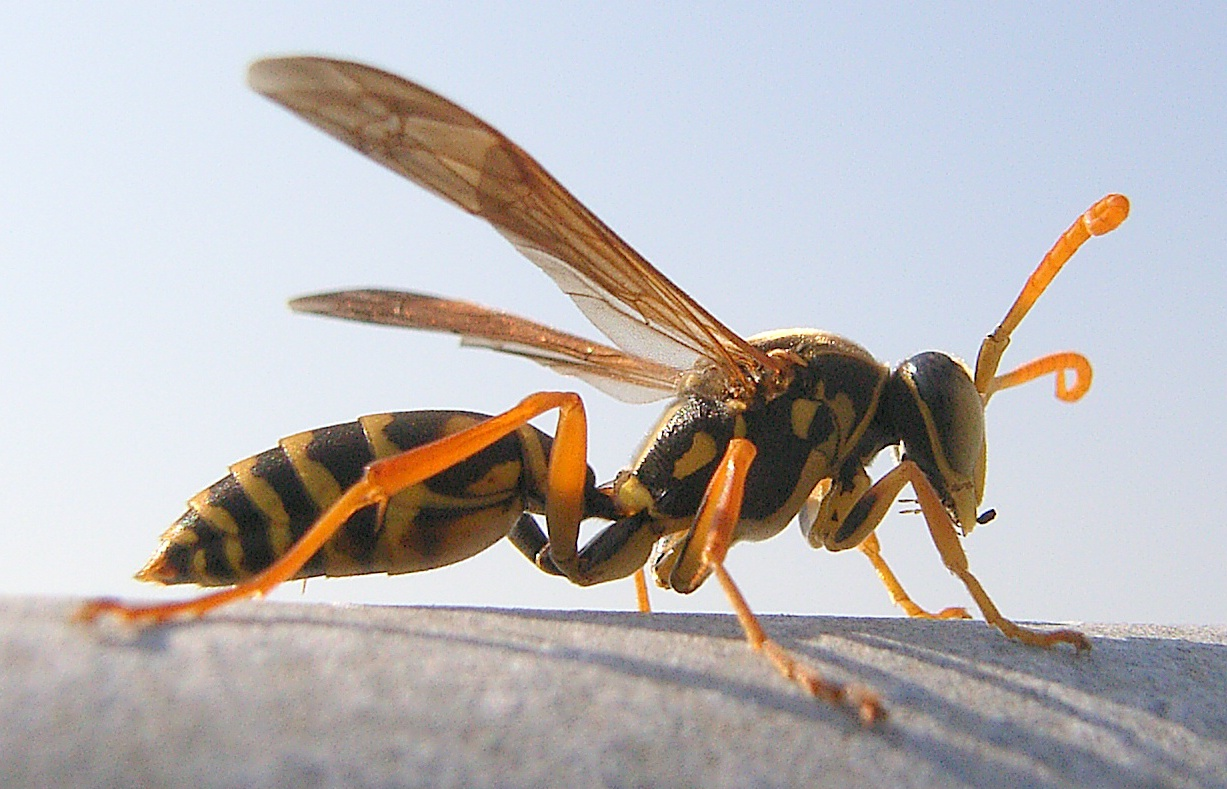
Polistes chinensis antennalis, Asian paper wasp has established itself as a pest species in New Zealand.

Along with the German and common wasps, the Asian and Australian paper wasps (P. chinensis and P. humilis) are considered pests in New Zealand. Arriving in 1979, the Asian paper wasp has established itself in both the North Island and the northern parts of the South Island. Because it competes with native species (such as the kaka) for insects, nectar, and honeydew, it is a hindrance to conservation efforts.

In North America, the introduced European species Polistes dominula has rapidly colonized a significant area, and is considered an invasive pest. It is a concern for cherry and grape growers in British Columbia, as it injures the fruit by biting off the skin. It also spreads yeast and fungi that harm fruit and can be a nuisance to workers and pickers at harvest. There is evidence it has also displaced native paper wasp species by outcompeting them.

== Parasites ==
Various other insects are parasites or parasitoids of Polistes, including flies (e.g., Sarcophagidae), mantispids, and wasps in the families Torymidae, Mutillidae (rarely), Braconidae, and Ichneumonidae (e.g. Latibulus argiolus). Some more specialized groups are more intimately associated with Polistes; this includes strepsipterans in the family Stylopidae (genus Xenos), wasps of the genus Elasmus (formerly placed in their own family, "Elasmidae"), and wasps in the family Trigonalidae.

The nests of many species of this wasp genus are invaded by the parasitoid caterpillars of the moth Chalcoela iphitalis which feed on the wasp larvae and pupas at night, spinning their cocoons in empty cells.

Within the subgenus Polistes are four known social obligate parasites: P. atrimandibularis, P. austroccidentalis, P. maroccanus, and P. semenowi, which parasitize other Polistes wasps. Known host species of these parasites are P. dominulus, P. gallicus, P. nimphus, P. associus, and P. biglumis. Although these parasites differ in their host invasion strategies, their end goal is to successfully infiltrate the host nest and reproduce at the host's expense.
