= Polistes actaeon =

Scientific classification
- Kingdom: Animalia
- Phylum: Arthropoda
- Clade: Pancrustacea
- Class: Insecta
- Order: Hymenoptera
- Family: Vespidae
- Subfamily: Polistinae
- Tribe: Polistini
- Genus: Polistes
- Species: P. actaeon

Binomial name
- Polistes actaeon (Haliday, 1836)

Species of wasp

Polistes actaeon is a species of social paper wasp found in southern Brazil.
