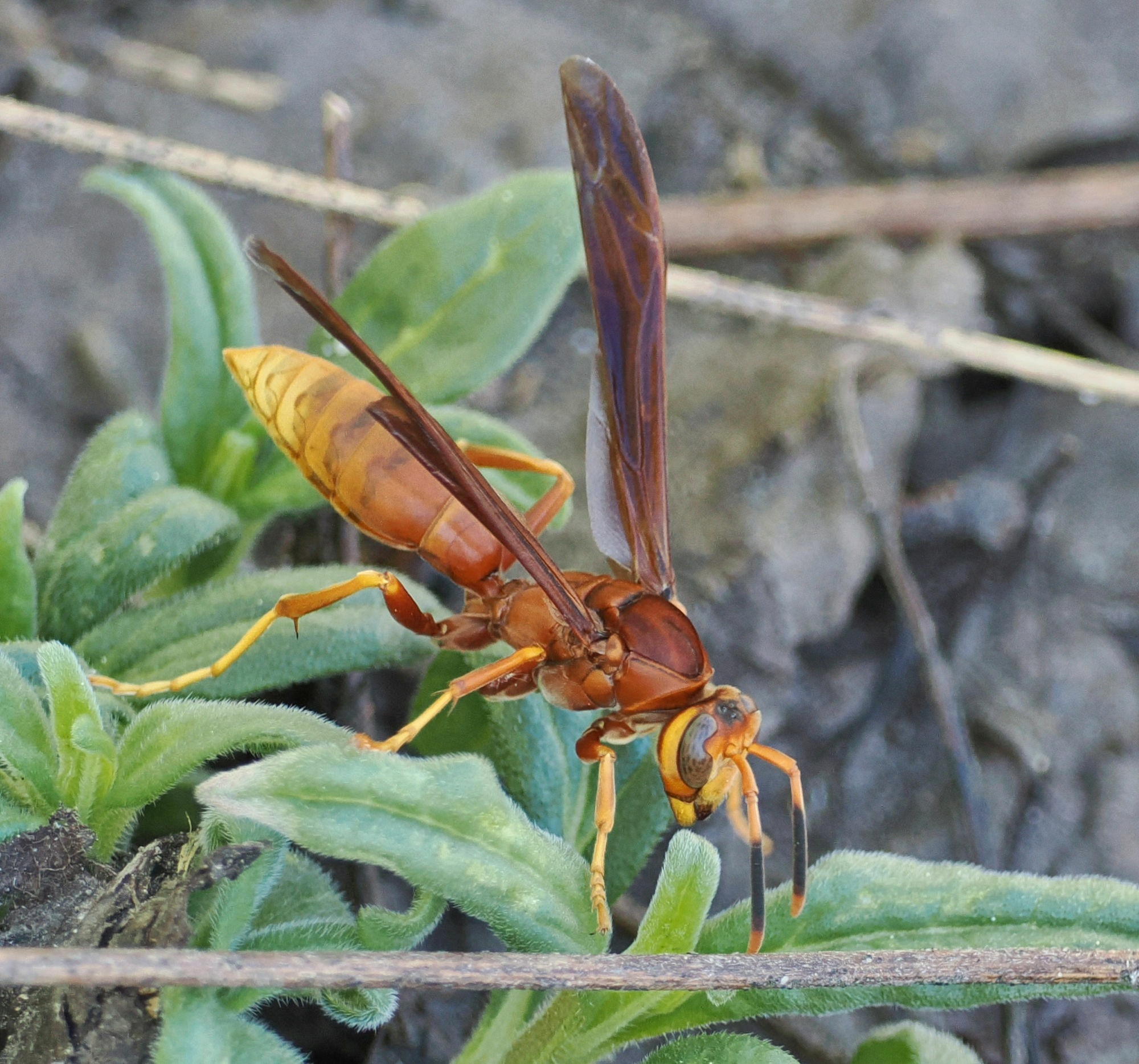

Scientific classification
- Kingdom: Animalia
- Phylum: Arthropoda
- Clade: Pancrustacea
- Class: Insecta
- Order: Hymenoptera
- Family: Vespidae
- Genus: Polistes
- Species: P. kaibabensis

Binomial name
- Polistes kaibabensis Hayward, 1932

= Polistes kaibabensis =

Species of wasp

The Kaibab paper wasp (Polistes kaibabensis) is a species of wasp in the family Vespidae, it is a medium-sized wasp typically measuring 13-25 mm (1.3-2.5 cm) in length. It is endemic and restricted to North Central Arizona, specifically the Kaibab Plateau near the Grand Canyon at high-elevation meadows and open forests in the Colorado Plateau region. Yellow to brown colouration and slender body, it is predatory on caterpillars for their larvae while adults feed on nectar and sugary secretions. Nests are made of paper being exposed combs suspended from vegetation.
