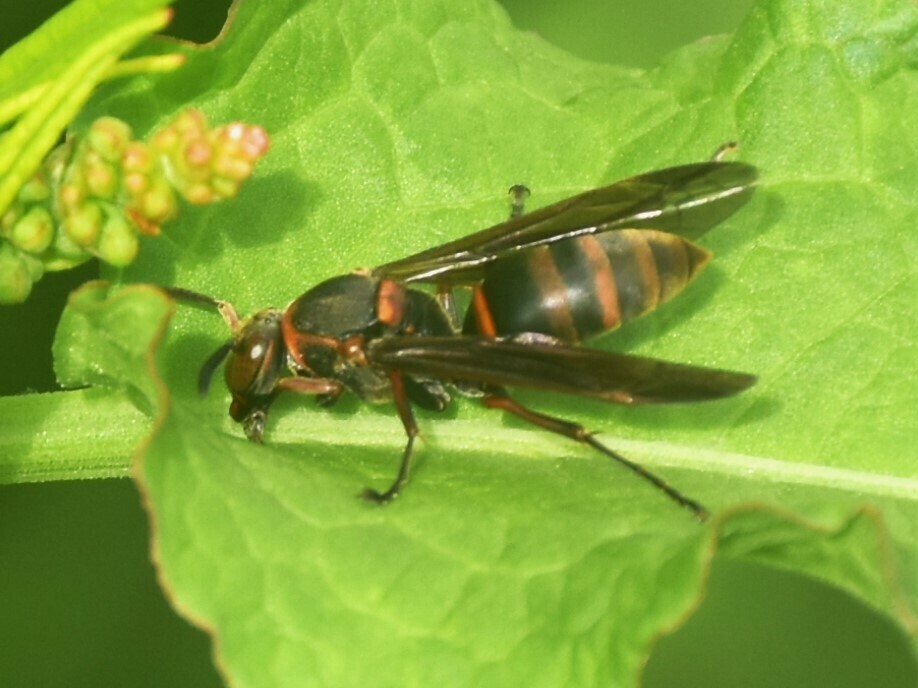
- P. adustus photographed in India

Scientific classification
- Domain: Eukaryota
- Kingdom: Animalia
- Phylum: Arthropoda
- Class: Insecta
- Order: Hymenoptera
- Family: Vespidae
- Subfamily: Polistinae
- Genus: Polistes
- Species: P. adustus

Binomial name
- Polistes adustus Bingham, 1897

Synonyms
- Polistes sordidus Dover, 1925

= Polistes adustus =

Species of insect

Polistes adustus is a species of paper wasp in the genus Polistes.

== Distribution ==
P. adustus is found in India, Nepal, and China.
