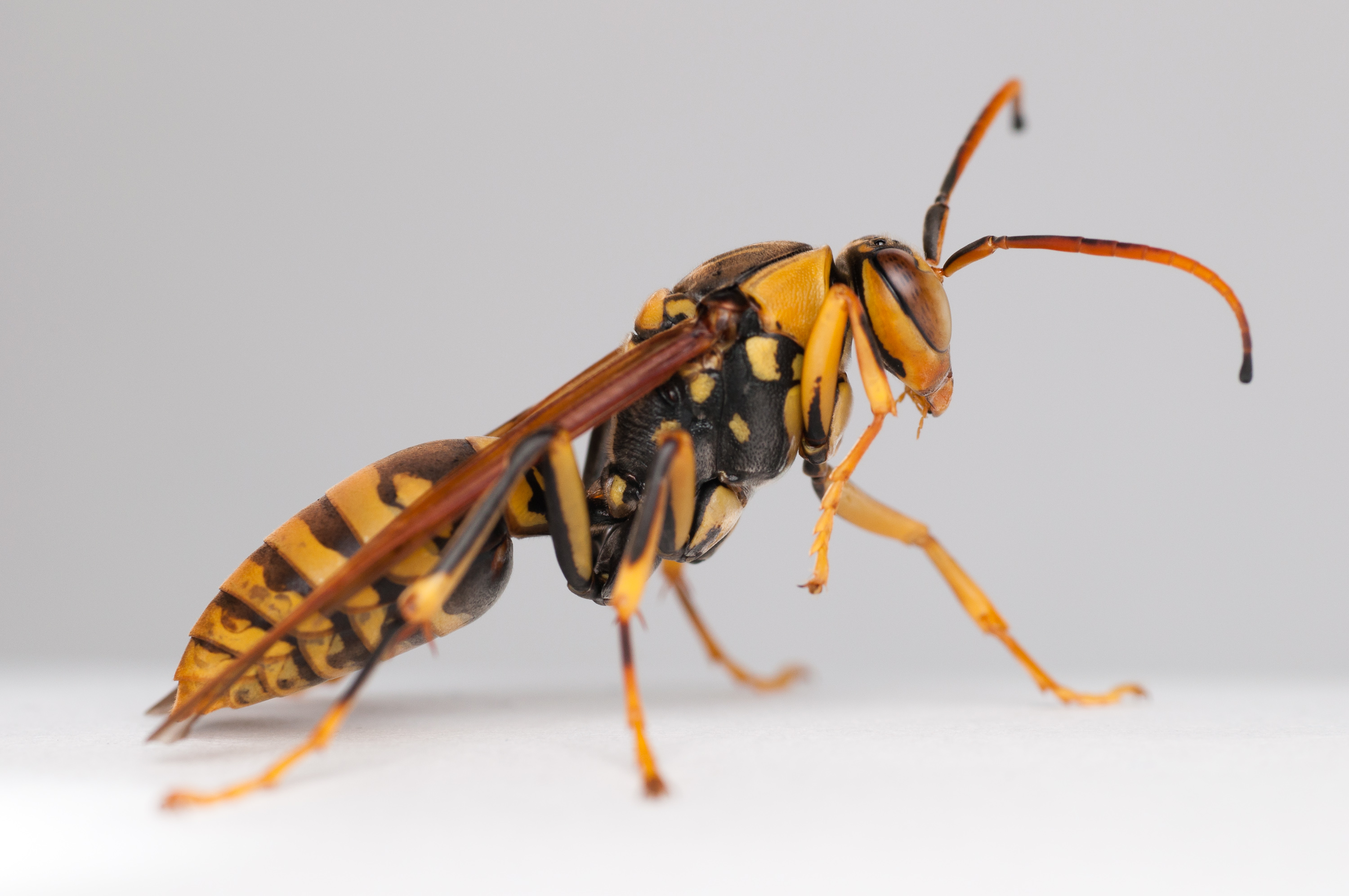

Scientific classification
- Kingdom: Animalia
- Phylum: Arthropoda
- Class: Insecta
- Order: Hymenoptera
- Family: Vespidae
- Genus: Polistes
- Species: P. rothneyi

Binomial name
- Polistes rothneyi Cameron, 1900

= Polistes rothneyi =

Species of wasp

Polistes rothneyi is a species of paper wasp from China, Korea, Japan, and Taiwan. It is named after the collector George Alexander James Rothney.
