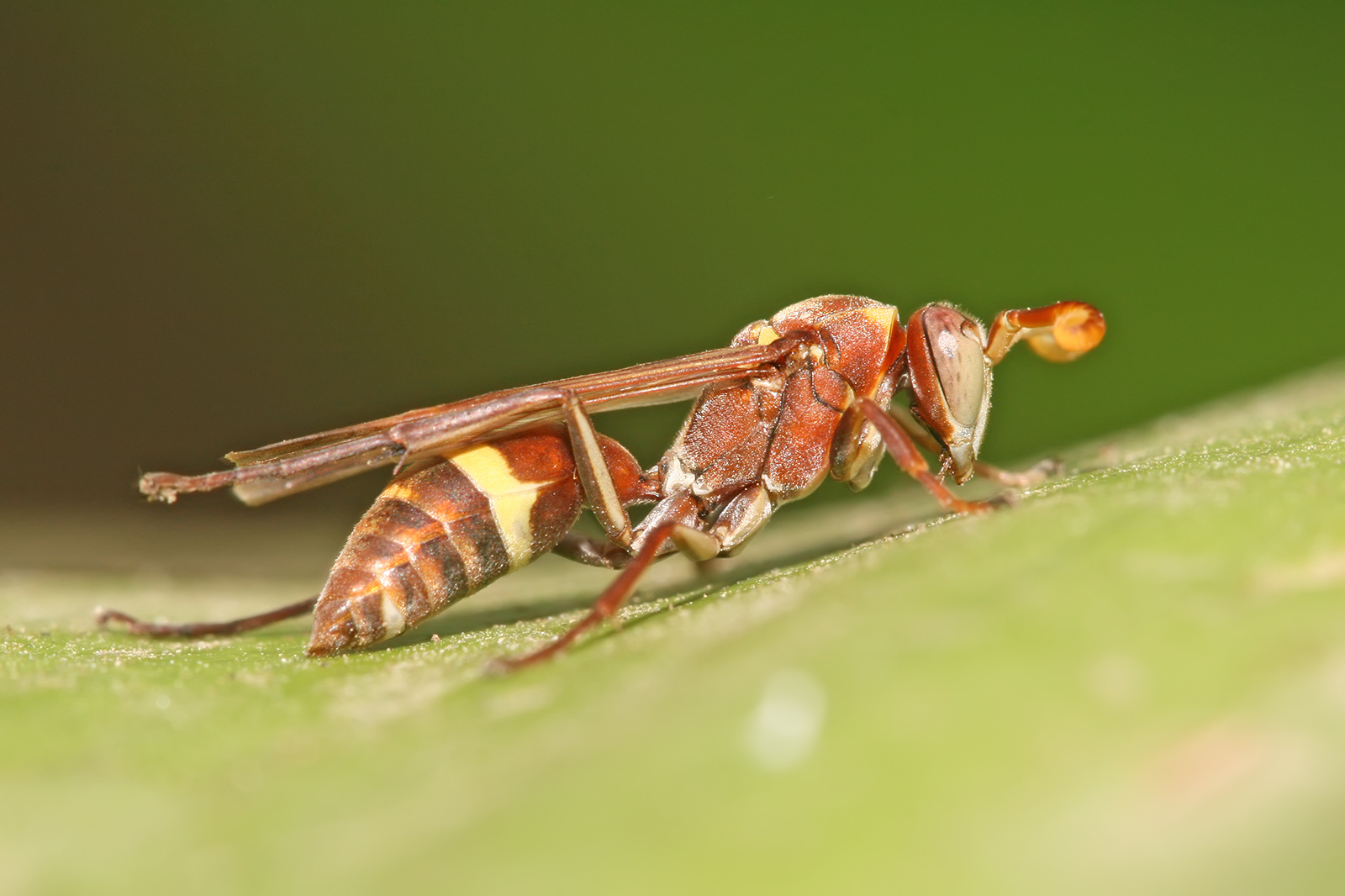

Scientific classification
- Domain: Eukaryota
- Kingdom: Animalia
- Phylum: Arthropoda
- Class: Insecta
- Order: Hymenoptera
- Family: Vespidae
- Subfamily: Polistinae
- Genus: Polistes
- Species: P. africanus

Binomial name
- Polistes africanus Palisot de Beauvois, 1818

= Polistes africanus =

Species of wasp

Polistes africanus is a species of paper wasp found in Africa. Its range includes Senegal, Liberia, Nigeria, Cameroon, Zaire, Kenya, Somalia, Tanzania including Zanzibar, Comoros and South Africa (Kwazulu-Natal, Western Cape Province).
