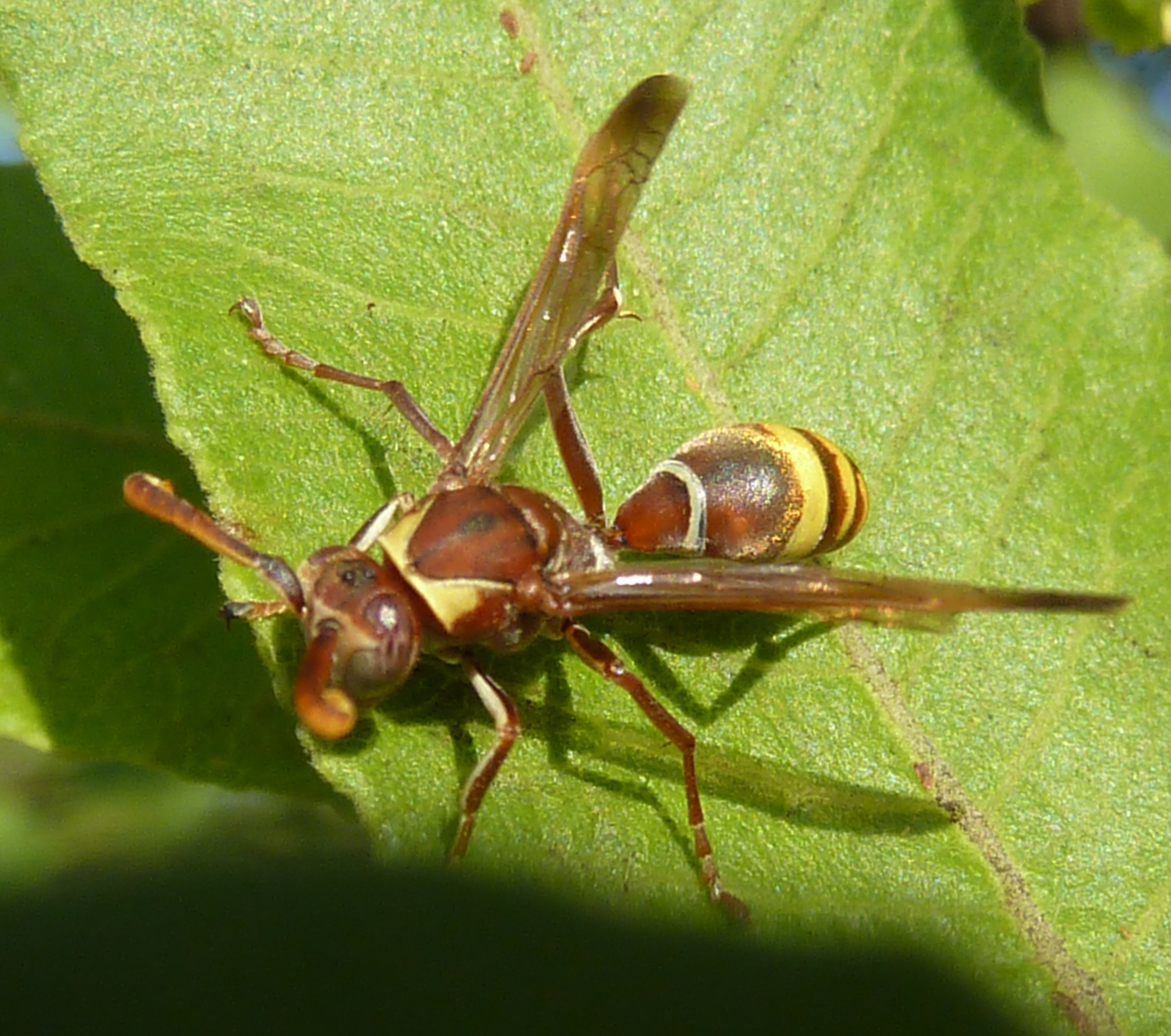

Scientific classification
- Domain: Eukaryota
- Kingdom: Animalia
- Phylum: Arthropoda
- Class: Insecta
- Order: Hymenoptera
- Family: Vespidae
- Subfamily: Polistinae
- Genus: Polistes
- Species: P. fastidiosus

Binomial name
- Polistes fastidiosus Saussure, 1853

= Polistes fastidiosus =

Species of wasp

Polistes fastidiosus is a species of paper wasp from Senegal; Guinea-Bissau; Ivory Coast; Benin; Nigeria; Zaire; Sudan; Somalia; Saudi Arabia; Yemen; Kenya; Tanzania, including Zanzibar; Zambia; Mozambique; South Africa: Transvaal, Cape Prov.
