= Polistes hirsuticornis =

Scientific classification
- Kingdom: Animalia
- Phylum: Arthropoda
- Class: Insecta
- Order: Hymenoptera
- Family: Vespidae
- Subfamily: Polistinae
- Tribe: Polistini
- Genus: Polistes
- Species: P. hirsuticornis

Binomial name
- Polistes hirsuticornis Matthias Buck et al., 2012

Species of paper wasp

Polistes hirsuticornis is a species of paper wasp found in North America and described in 2012. Individuals were previously treated under several other species within the P. fuscatus-group (Polistes fuscatus, Polistes metricus, and Polistes bellicosus).

Diagnostic information can be found in the Identification Atlas of the Vespidae of the Northeastern Nearctic Region as "Polistes sp. A". It appears in the NCBI taxonomy as Polistes sp. Buck1.

This species is believed to be an obligate parasite of other social wasps, but no documented observations of this behavior have been made.
