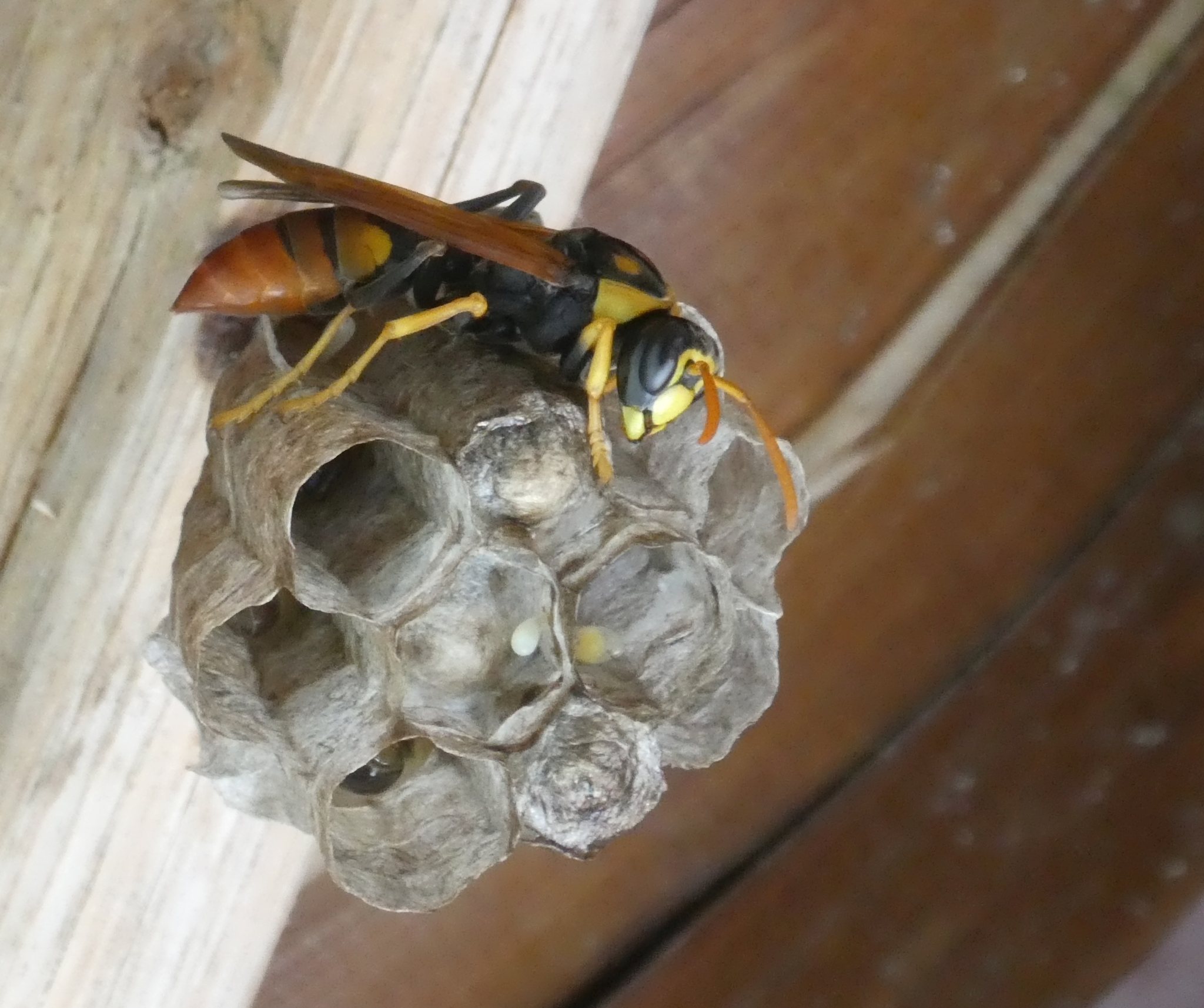
- Queen and its nest

Scientific classification
- Kingdom: Animalia
- Phylum: Arthropoda
- Clade: Pancrustacea
- Class: Insecta
- Order: Hymenoptera
- Family: Vespidae
- Subfamily: Polistinae
- Tribe: Polistini
- Genus: Polistes
- Species: P. tepidus

Binomial name
- Polistes tepidus (Fabricius, 1775)

Synonyms
- Vespa tepida Fabricius, 1775

= Polistes tepidus =

Species of wasp

Polistes tepidus is a species of wasp in the family Vespidae. It was described by Johan Christian Fabricius in 1775. The species is endemic to parts of Oceania, primarily Indonesia, Papua New Guinea, Australia, and the Solomon Islands. Workers feed upon caterpillars to cache food for their nest. Nests are usually located in trees or other foliage but can also be found within human structures.

== Subspecies ==
The following 7 subspecies are recognized:

- Polistes tepidus batjanensis Cameron, 1911
- Polistes tepidus malayanus Cameron, 1906
- Polistes tepidus manusensis Petersen, 1990
- Polistes tepidus picteti de Saussure, 1853
- Polistes tepidus speciosus du Buysson, 1913
- Polistes tepidus tepidus (Fabricius, 1775)
- Polistes tepidus theodoris Petersen, 1990
