= Wolfgang Karl Weyrauch =

- Born: December 7, 1907; Elberfeld, Germany
- Died: 1970 (aged 62–63)
- Education: University of Berlin (PhD)
- Scientific career
- Fields: Malacology, entomology
- Workplaces: German Council of Scientific Research; Universidad Mayor de San Marcos; Pontificia Universidad Católica del Lima; Instituto Miguel Lillo

Wolfgang Karl Weyrauch (1907–1970) was a German-Peruvian malacologist and entomologist.

== Life ==
Weyrauch was born on December 7, 1907, in Elberfeld, Germany. He received his PhD in Zoology in 1929 from the University of Berlin with a thesis on insect neurophysiology. From 1928 to 1929, he was an assistant of Richard Hesse, and from 1931 to 1943 he worked for the German Council of Scientific Research doing field studies in entomology and ecology.

In 1938, he worked as an entomologist at the agricultural experimental station (Estación Agrícola de La Molina) in Lima, Peru. At the time of World War II, he moved to Texas, where he did field work in entomology and malacology. In 1946, he was at the Estación experimental Agrícola de Tingo María in Lima. From 1948 on, he worked for the Universidad Mayor de San Marcos in Lima as a Professor of zoology and Genetics at the Museo Nacional de Historia. In addition, he was from 1959 to 1961 Professor of agricultural zoology at the Pontificia Universidad Católica del Lima. In 1962, he went to Argentina and became professor at the Instituto Miguel Lillo in Tucumán. He died of a heart attack in 1970.

== Works ==
Weyrauch studied land and freshwater gastropods of South America, mainly taxa belonging to the families Camaenidae, Charopidae, Clausiliidae, Endodontidae, Helicinidae, “Hydrobiidae”, Orthalicidae, Pupillidae, Scolodontidae, Subulinidae, and Urocoptidae. He left behind many type specimens in museums, of which he published no original description. Some of his collections are at the Field Museum of Natural History in Chicago, USA, and the Auckland War Memorial Museum, New Zealand. He was the author of 198 molluscan names.

== Species named in his honor ==
The following gastropod species were named after Weyrauch:

- Bostryx weyrauchi Pilsbry, 1944
- Neopetraeus weyrauchi Pilsbry, 1944
- Thaumastus weyrauchi Pilsbry, 1944
- Nenia weyrauchi Pilsbry, 1945
- Incapora weyrauchi Du Bois-Reymond Marcus, 1953

Also, a species of snake is named after Weyrauch:

- Leptotyphlops weyrauchi Orejas-Miranda, 1964

A species of wasp is also named after Weyrauch:

- Polistes weyrauchorum Willink, 1964

Two species of harvestmen are also named after Weyrauch:

- Chusgonobius weyrauchi Roewer, 1952
- Andrescava weyrauchi Roewer, 1957
