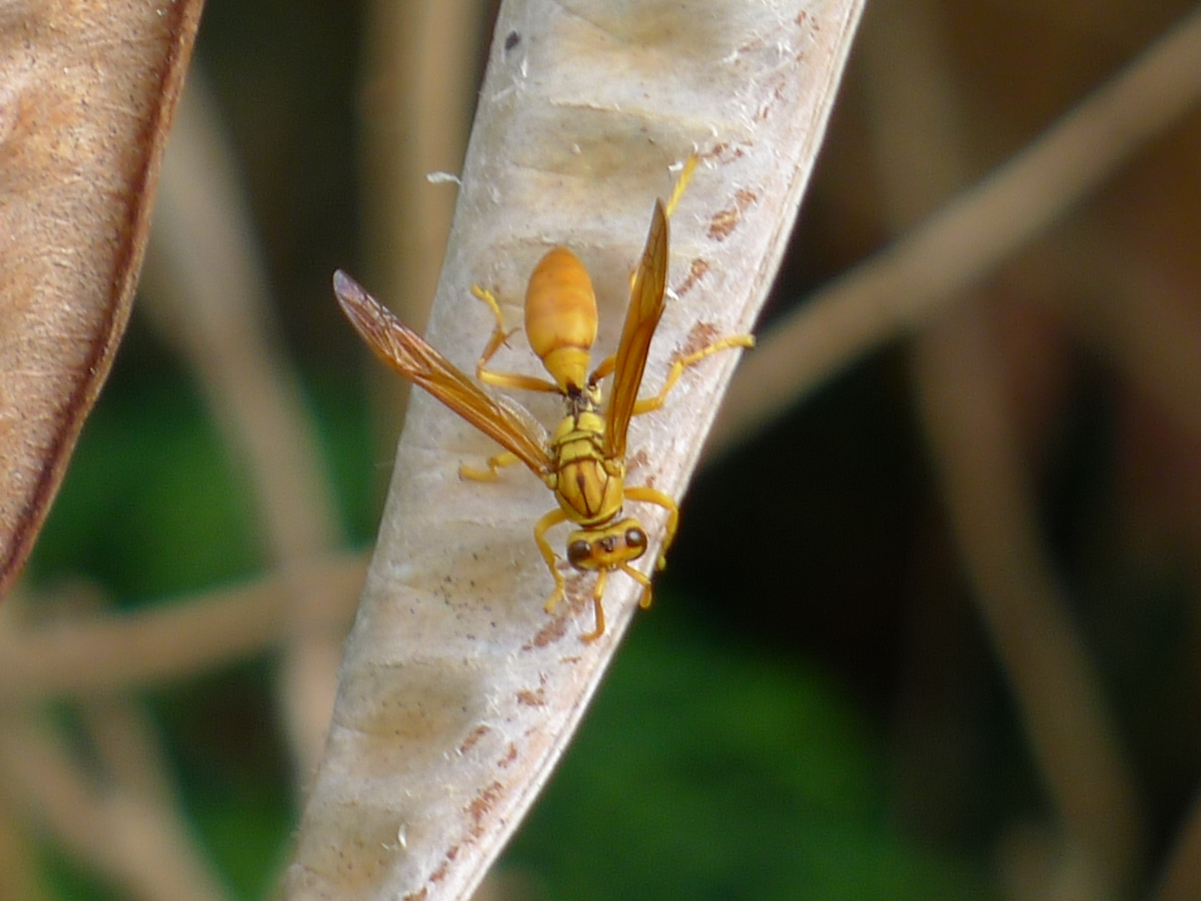

Scientific classification
- Domain: Eukaryota
- Kingdom: Animalia
- Phylum: Arthropoda
- Class: Insecta
- Order: Hymenoptera
- Family: Vespidae
- Subfamily: Polistinae
- Genus: Polistes
- Species: P. balder

Binomial name
- Polistes balder Kirby, 1888

= Polistes balder =

Species of wasp

Polistes balder is a species of paper wasp in the Polistes genus from Australia to Christmas Island.
