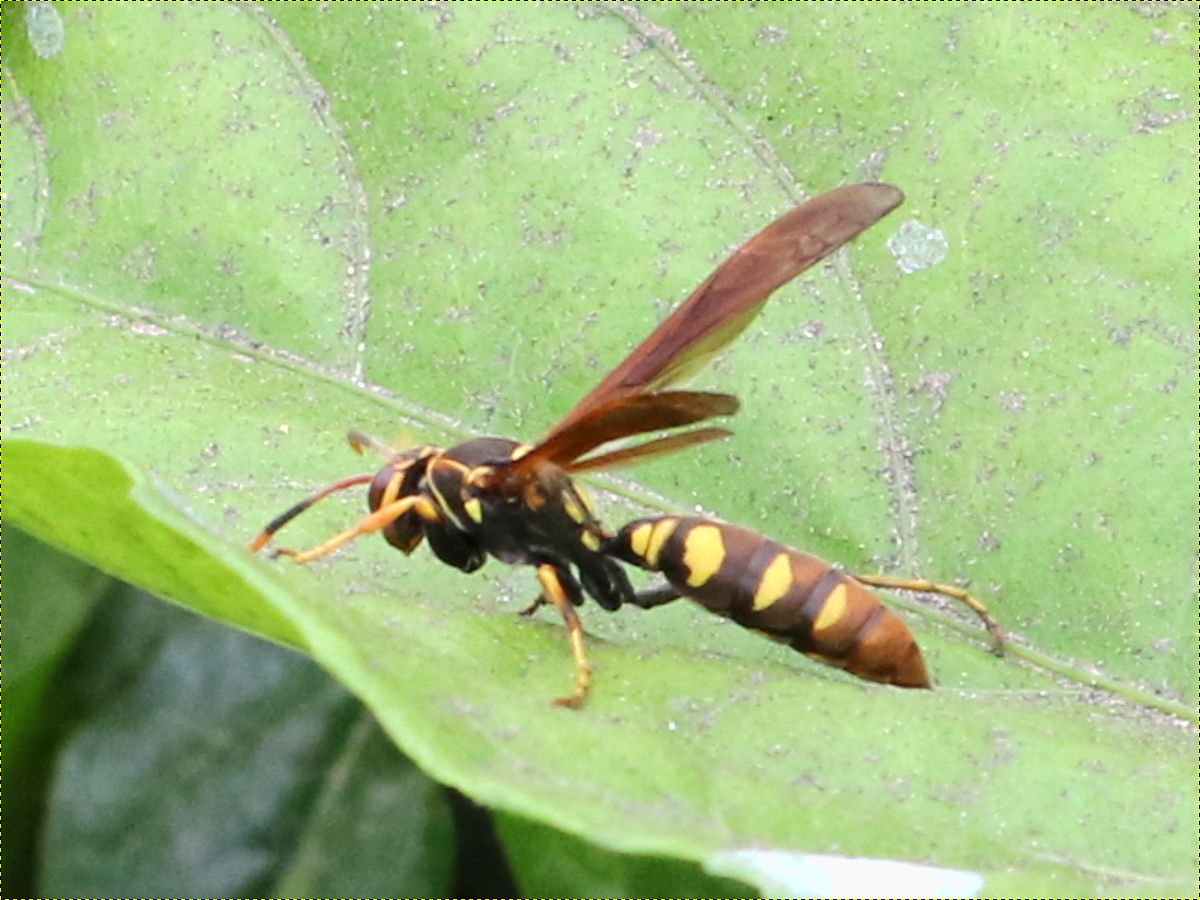

Scientific classification
- Kingdom: Animalia
- Phylum: Arthropoda
- Clade: Pancrustacea
- Class: Insecta
- Order: Hymenoptera
- Family: Vespidae
- Genus: Polistes
- Species: P. weyrauchorum

Binomial name
- Polistes weyrauchorum Willink, 1964

= Polistes weyrauchorum =

Species of wasp

Polistes weyrauchorum is a species of paper wasp in the family Vespidae. It is found along narrow strip along the western coast of South America, from Ecuador to northern Chile. Polites weyrauchorum is locally known as pulato o púlate in Chiclayo. It is part of the subgenus Polistes (Aphanilopterus).
