= Canadensis =

Canadensis is a Neo-Latin term meaning of Canada, used in taxonomy to denote species indigenous to or strongly associated with Canada.

== Mammals ==
- Castor canadensis, common names American beaver, Canadian beaver, or North American beaver
- Cervus canadensis, common name elk or wapiti
- Lontra canadensis, common name northern river otter or North American river otter
- Lynx canadensis, common name Canadian lynx
- Ovis canadensis, common name bighorn sheep

== Birds ==
- Aquila chrysaetos canadensis, common name golden eagle
- Branta canadensis, common name Canada goose
- Branta hutchinsii or Branta canadensis hutchinsii, common name cackling goose
- Canachites canadensis, common name spruce grouse or Canada grouse
- Grus canadensis, common name sandhill crane
- Perisoreus canadensis, common name Canada jay, moosebird, or gray jay
- Sakesphorus canadensis, common name black-crested antshrike
- Sitta canadensis, common name red-breasted nuthatch
- Cardellina canadensis, common name Canada warbler
- Caryothraustes canadensis, common name yellow-green grosbeak

== Fish ==
- Sander canadensis, common name sauger

== Insects ==
- Argyresthia canadensis, a moth with common name Canadian arborvitae leafminer or cedar leafminer
- Calyptra canadensis, a moth with common name Canadian owlet
- Harpagoxenus canadensis, a species of ant
- Aedes canadensis, a species of mosquito
- Ochlerotatus canadensis, a species of mosquito
- Papilio canadensis, a butterfly with common name Canadian tiger swallowtail
- Sphinx canadensis, a moth with common name Canadian sphinx
- Tephronota canadensis, a species of fly
- Trypeta canadensis, a species of fly
- Zeiraphera canadensis, a moth with common name spruce bud moth

The red paper wasp Polistes canadensis was incorrectly classified by Carl Linnaeus in 1758 because he had been misinformed about the source location of the specimen.

== Nematodes ==
- Heterodera canadensis, a plant pathogen

== Plants ==
- Allium canadense, common name wild onion, meadow garlic, tree onion, and Canadian garlic
- Amelanchier canadensis, with many common names, including Canadian serviceberry, Juneberry, shadblow serviceberry, shadblow, shadbush, shadbush serviceberry, sugarplum, thicket serviceberry
- Anemone canadensis, a synonym of Anemonastrum canadense, common name Canada anemone
- Antennaria canadensis, a subspecies of Antennaria howellii, common name Canada pussytoes
- Aquilegia canadensis, common name wild columbine, Canadian columbine, or red columbine
- Arabis canadensis, common name sicklepod
- Astragalus canadensis, common name milk-vetch
- Bromus ciliatus or Bromus canadensis, common name fringed brome
- Calamagrostis canadensis, common name Canada bluejoint, Canada reedgrass, Langsdorff's reedgrass, or Macoun's reedgrass
- Cercis canadensis, common name eastern redbud
- Circaea canadensis
- Collinsonia canadensis, with many common names, including Canada horsebalm, richweed, hardhack, heal-all, horseweed, ox-balm and stone root
- Conyza canadensis, with many common names, including horseweed, Canadian horseweed, Canadian fleabane, coltstail, marestail and butterweed
- Cornus canadensis, common name Canadian dwarf cornel, Canadian bunchberry or crackerberry
- Cryptotaenia canadensis, common name Canada honewort
- Dicentra canadensis, common name squirrel corn
- Elodea canadensis, common name American waterweed, common waterweed, or Canadian waterweed and Anacharis
- Elymus canadensis, common name Canada wild rye
- Hydrastis canadensis, common name goldenseal, orange-root, or orangeroot
- Lactuca canadensis, a variety of lettuce with multiple sub-species, with common names Canada lettuce, Florida blue lettuce, and wild lettuce
- Laportea canadensis, common name wood nettle
- Mentha canadensis, a species of mint
- Nuttallanthus canadensis or Linaria canadensis, with many common names, including blue toad-flax, blue toadflax, old-field toadflax, toad-flax
- Pedicularis canadensis, common name wood betony and Canada lousewort
- Populus × canadensis, common name Canadian or Carolina poplar, hybrid of P. nigra and P. deltoides
- Sambucus canadensis, common name American elderberry
- Sanguinaria canadensis, common name bloodroot
- Sanguisorba canadensis, common name Canadian burnet
- Sanicula canadensis, common name black snakeroot
- Shepherdia canadensis, common name Canada buffaloberry
- Solidago canadensis, common name Canada golden-rod or Canada goldenrod
- Stipa canadensis, common name feather grass, needle grass, and spear grass
- Taxus canadensis, common name Canadian yew
- Tsuga canadensis, common name eastern hemlock or Canadian hemlock
- Viola canadensis, common name Canadian white violet, Canada violet, tall white violet, or white violet

== Other ==
Extinct species include:

- Anomalocaris canadensis, or anomalous shrimp
- Bothriolepis canadensis, a Late Devonian species of placoderm fish
- Brachylophosaurus canadensis, a mid-sized member of the hadrosaurid family of dinosaurs
- Grewingkia canadensis, a species of prehistoric coral
- Leidyosuchus canadensis, an alligatorid
- Monoclonius canadensis, included with Chasmosaurus canadensis
- Pachyrhinosaurus canadensis, an ornithischian dinosaur from the Late Cretaceous period
- Palaeosaniwa canadensis, a carnivorous lizard from the Late Cretaceous period
- Plumulites canadensis, an annelid worm and member of the machaeridian family
- Xanioascus canadensis, a ctenophore

Pathogens:

- Typhula ishikariensis var. canadensis

== See also ==
- Canadensis, Pennsylvania, US, in Monroe County
- Including use as a species name
- Including use as a species name
- Atlantic whitefish, binomial name Coregonus huntsmani, was once known as Coregonus canadensis until it was reclassified in 1987
