= Yellow paper wasp =

Red paper wasp can refer to:

- Polistes flavus, found in the desert southwestern United States and Mexico
- Polistes olivaceus, found in India, East Asia, East Africa, and Pacific islands
- Polistes versicolor, found in South America
- Ropalidia romandi, found in Australia
