= P. canadensis =

P. canadensis may refer to:

- Pachyrhinosaurus canadensis, a ceratopsid dinosaur species from the Late Cretaceous period of North America
- Papilio canadensis, the Canadian tiger swallowtail, a butterfly species found in North America
- Pedicularis canadensis, the wood betony, beefsteak plant, Canadian lousewort, high heal-all, snaffles or Canada lousewort, a flowering plant species found throughout North America
- Perisoreus canadensis, the gray jay, grey jay, Canada jay or Whiskey Jack, a bird species found in the boreal forests across North America
- Polistes canadensis, the red paper wasp, a Neotropical eusocial wasp
- Polymnia canadensis, the whiteflower leafcup, a flowering plant species native to eastern North America from Ontario south to Alabama and from Kansas east to Vermont and Connecticut

== See also ==
- Canadensis (disambiguation)
