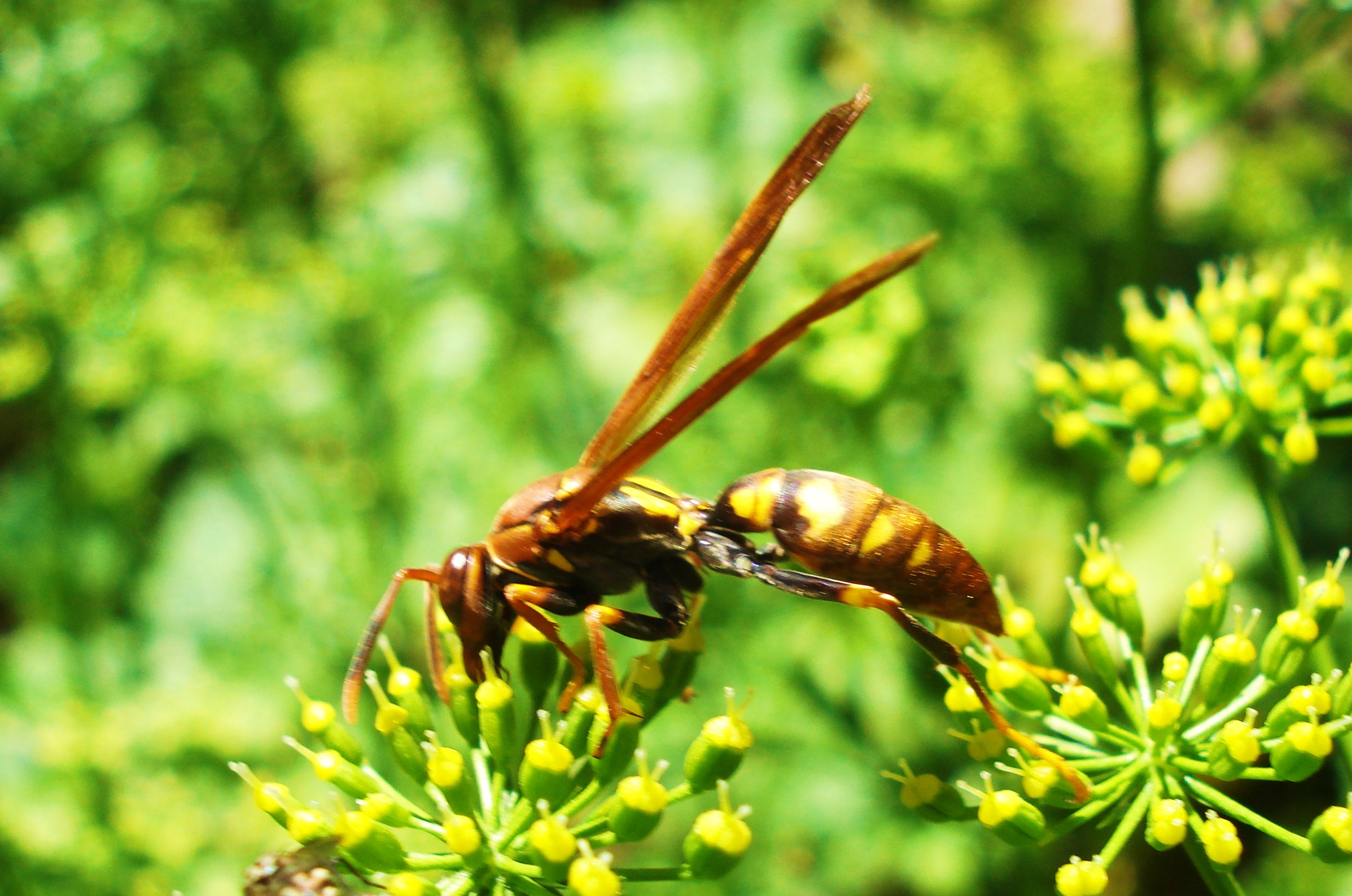

Scientific classification
- Kingdom: Animalia
- Phylum: Arthropoda
- Clade: Pancrustacea
- Class: Insecta
- Order: Hymenoptera
- Family: Vespidae
- Subfamily: Polistinae
- Tribe: Polistini
- Genus: Polistes
- Species: P. versicolor

Binomial name
- Polistes versicolor (Olivier, 1791)

Synonyms
- Polistes opalinus Saussure, 1853; Polistes vulgaris Bequard, 1934; Vespa myops Fabricius, 1798; Vespa versicolor Olivier, 1792

= Polistes versicolor =

Variegated paper wasp

Species of wasp

Polistes versicolor, also known as the variegated paper wasp or yellow paper wasp (Note: Not to be confused with Polistes flavus, Polistes olivaceus, or Polistes wattii.), is a subtropical social wasp within Polistes, the most common genus of paper wasp. It is the most widely distributed of South American wasp species and is particularly common in the Southeastern Brazilian states. The P. versicolor nest, made of chewed vegetable fiber, is typically a single, uncovered comb attached to the substrate by a single petiole. The yellow wasp is frequently found in urban areas. New nests and colonies are usually founded by an association of females, sometimes in human buildings.

The P. versicolor colony cycle broadly ranges from 3 to 10 months, although there appears to be no relationship between the colony's development and the season of the year. While P. versicolor do have clear annual colony cycles, many young queens have the opportunity to hibernate during the winter, forming optional winter aggregations. Dominance hierarchies within these aggregations are characterized by physical aggression of the dominant female(s) towards the associated females, who tend to be sisters. Wagging movements are also often used as a form of communication within the colony. P. versicolor is generally predatory, capturing a wide range of insects, although it often feeds on pollen and nectar as well. Therefore, P. versicolor can be useful as a pollinator or as effective pest control.

== Taxonomy and phylogeny ==
The French entomologist Guillaume-Antoine Olivier described P. versicolor in 1791. Its species name, versicolor, is a Latin term that means a variety of colors, perhaps referring to the bright coloration of its abdomen and thorax. Within the subfamily Polistinae of the family Vespidae, the genus Polistes (paper wasps) has about 200 species distributed throughout the world mostly in the tropical region. A widely studied genus, Polistes is now considered a model organism useful in understanding the evolution of social behavior. P. versicolor is a member of the New World Polistes, which are found in the subgenus Aphanilopterus. As morphological variation among the Aphanilopterus is small, P. versicolor shares many similarities with its Aphanilopterus relatives, especially P. instabilis. Both species may form winter aggregations when living at high altitudes. Ecologically, P. versicolor lives in conditions similar to those of other temperate zone species, such as P. fuscatus (in the subgenus Fuscopolistes) and P. canadensis (also in the subgenus Aphanilopterus). While the seasonal conditions are not drastic in terms of temperature, these species both live in places with a pronounced dry season.

== Description and identification ==
Both male and female P. versicolor have yellow transparent wings and a black body featuring the characteristic yellow bands on the thorax and abdomen. The differences between females are exclusively size-related. Within an aggregation of P. versicolor, the queens are the indisputably largest females and newly emerged females are the smallest. Aggregated females are larger than all other females. The female body sizes within a colony often depend on the environmental conditions: an increase in body size is often seen with the approach of an unfavorable season.

== Nest construction ==
New colonies and nests are usually founded by an association of females. Before beginning the construction, the foundress first makes recognition flights, inspecting the structure to be used for the nest by flying close to the selected area and touching the substrate with its antennae. The papery nests are often a grayish coloration and frequently built on gypsum plaster. Foundations of nests on gypsum plaster have been found to be significantly larger than those on other types of substrate, a testament to the synanthropy of P. versicolor. On average, the P. versicolor nest consists of 244.2 cells and 171.67 adult wasps. Colony size can vary from seven females (foundress associations) to nearly 100 females (mature colonies). Once the location for the new colony foundation is established, the construction begins with the peduncle: vegetable material is chewed with saliva and then attached to the substrate in thread form. The first cell is then constructed with a circular format, during which the female constantly touches the cell sides with its antennae. Afterwards, hexagonal outlines are formed as peripheral cells are built around the initial circular cell and attached to neighboring cells. As larvae develop in the cells, chewed vegetable fiber is added to the extremities of the cells to elevate their wall height. Throughout the colony cycle, as the colonies grow and the cell numbers increase, the peduncle is further reinforced with additional plant fiber to ensure adequate support for the nest as it enlarges.

== Distribution and habitat ==
Widely distributed throughout South America, P. versicolor ranges from Costa Rica to Argentina. High densities of P. versicolor have been observed on the high mountains of the Turimiquire massif in Anzoategui State, Venezuela, most likely caused by migration due to the seasonal periodicity associated with the dry season.

P. versicolor nests can frequently be found in natural environments with substrata consisting of leaves, branches, roots, stones, and even the abandoned nests of other social wasp species. In some cases, the wasp actually takes over empty Mischocyttarus drewseni nests to lay their eggs instead of creating their own nests. Often, however, its nests are found in human constructions; P. versicolor is facultatively synanthropic. P. versicolor even appear to nest preferably in human constructions in areas with little human activity; nests in natural vegetation are increasingly rare. This has been linked to the fact that the fragility of plants often does not offer appropriate support for the nest and exposes the nest to the stress of weather. In contrast, nests on manmade gypsum plaster are typically found in high places in buildings, where these nests are highly protected from not only human interference, but also weather and direct solar irradiation.

== Colony cycle ==
While P. versicolor seems to rely on strictly annual colony cycles at high latitudes and altitudes, the colony cycle length can vary; short-cycle colonies can have life expectancies ranging from three to six months while long-cycle colonies can range from six to ten months. In colonies studied in southwest Brazil (where P. versicolor is particularly common), the colony cycle broadly ranges from 3 to 10 months. Although the climatic conditions may directly or indirectly affect colony productivity, P. versicolor is an asynchronous species, as there appears to be no relationship between the colony's development and the season of the year. An aggregation may start in the broad interval of March to August and founders do not leave the aggregation at the same time. Therefore, new foundations can occur in different periods. In southeastern Brazil, aggregations of P. versicolor start in early March, before winter, and last until mid-August. The egg stage can vary from 5 to 16 days long, the larval stage can vary from 12 to 46 days long, and the pupal stage can vary from 16 to 26 days long. The average lifetime of a subordinate worker ranges from 10 to 17 days. Males can stay in the colony for a few days before being forced by leave by the females. While only new queens traditionally initiate new colonies as they leave their previous nests, aggregation within P. versicolor represents an alternative path for females, offering them the choice between starting a new nest and waiting to be a foundress. Newly emerged females can thus choose to be workers, waiting a year to be a foundress until more favorable conditions arise. Females with long colony cycles could also replace a reproductive as an egg layer on the former nest as well.

=== Winter aggregations ===
P. versicolor have clear annual colony cycles, but the young queens of the colonies also have the opportunity to hibernate during the winter. Given the absence of a harsh climate, the occurrence of winter aggregations in the tropical P. versicolor is optional; there are some colonies that do not form these aggregations in their annual cycle. Winter aggregation is thus different from the diapause observed in species living in temperate climates subjected to adverse climatic conditions. Rather, winter aggregation in this tropical species reflects the behavioral adaptability of P. versicolor, allowing females to wait for better environmental conditions to start a new nest, rather than being forced to start a new nest as soon as they emerge. Winter aggregations (composed of hibernating queens) often produce larger females, who then are more likely to successfully become new queens. Within aggregations, most individuals possess developing ovaries. Young can develop their ovaries before the aggregation, but many females develop their ovaries during the time spent in aggregation while waiting for a better season to found a nest.

== Effects of human activity ==
With increasing numbers of P. versicolor nests built in urban areas in human constructions, P. versicolor have discovered many advantages, such as a reduction in interspecific competition, protection against a variety of climatic factors and protection from predation, especially by vertebrates.

=== On colony strategies ===
This increased interaction with human activity can clearly be seen on the varying strategies adopted by the wasp colonies. In habitats more altered by human activity, 60% of P. versicolor nests occur on human constructions and 40% occur on trees. In contrast, in habitats less altered by human activity, 100% of the nests are found in trees, even if there are buildings nearby. In the habitats less altered by human activity, there is a significant positive correlation between the number of cells constructed and the number of adults produced, as well as between the diameter of the petiole and the nest dry mass. In these colonies, the population increases proportionally with the size of the nest. This similar increase is not seen as clearly in habitats more altered by human activity. This may be because in environments with more human activity, a larger nest may attract more attention and is therefore more likely to be eliminated. P. versicolor may have adapted to this situation, preferring to reuse cells instead of increasing the size of the nest.

=== On colony productivity ===
Resulting ramifications on colony productivity have also been shown. The productivity in the habitat less altered is significantly higher than in the habitat more altered, with respect to the number of cells constructed, number of adults produced, dry mass of nests, and proportion of productive cells. In the habitats more altered by human activity, there is a large concentration of buildings and predominantly grassy vegetation, suggesting fewer available resources for which the colonies to build nests from. Habitat quality has been shown to help contribute to the lower colony productivity in these environments greatly altered by human activity. For example, the amount of resources (such as the larvae of other insects) available for feeding immatures has been more limited in habitats with higher human activity.

== Dominance hierarchy ==
With the tropical P. Versicolor, colony founding can often occur by multiple females as foundress females join to construct a new nest or, more traditionally, queens can initiate new nests separately. Just after the founding phase, a linear reproductive dominance hierarchy is established. The dominant female holds a monopoly on egg-laying, thereby spending longer periods of time within the nest while the workers forage. The dominant female also receives a greater share of food than her nestmates. In contrast, rather than focus on reproduction, the subordinate foundresses take on the workload of the nest, working on cell construction, nest defense, and foraging (for prey, nectar, water, etc.). Conflicts of interest among future foundresses remain high as they compete over the shared resources of nourishment, such as protein. Unequal nourishment is often what leads to the size differences that result in dominant-subordinate position rankings. As egg-layers tend to receive more protein than those who are not egg-layers, as is the general pattern, the dominant-subordinate context in P. versicolor is directly related to the exchange of food. Therefore, if during the winter aggregate, the female is able to obtain greater access to food, the female could thus reach a dominant position. This competition and aggression over resources suggest that winter aggregations can be fragile associations. Aggression is usually seen when a usurping female challenges the founder. This aggression can range from nipping to the more extreme physical forms of aggression such as biting and stinging (often fatal).

== Division of labor ==
While the distribution of P. versicolor behavior in the post-emergence phase shows little relationship to an individual's age, the distribution of labor appears instead to correlate with dominant and subordinate statuses (which tend to correlate with size). Dominant females check cells, build new cells, and oviposit significantly more frequently than subordinates. Meanwhile, subordinate females also perform tasks like licking the nest petiole, feeding the larvae, and foraging more frequently than dominant females. Subordinates complete 81.4% of the total foraging activity, while dominants only complete 18.6% of the total foraging.

=== Worker activity ===
The worker activity in P. versicolor is episodic, characterized by pause periods (when all individuals are immobile) and periods of intense activity (most individuals are in motion; wasps are foraging, feeding larvae, and interacting with each other). No single individual (or queen) is responsible for starting and stopping periods of activity or physically stimulating the departure of workers. Rather, the organization of working periods seems to be more of a self-organizing, decentralized system in which the workers themselves regulate colony activity. This is a more efficient way to satisfy the colony because the colony development and nest maintenance activities can continue even after queen loss. Most activity periods are triggered by workers returning from foraging to the nest with material for the colony. Foraging activity itself appears to be influenced by the interactions between various members of the colony or direct access of workers to the needs of the colony. Some of the mechanisms that can regulate foraging activity include aggression.

== Reproductive suppression ==
Either an association of females or one dominant queen often founds P. versicolor nests; reproductive dominance is often established soon after the founding period. This reproductive dominance is often characterized by physical aggression of the dominant female(s) directed at the associated females who tend to be sisters. Most females who join aggregations have undeveloped ovaries, while most females from foundress associations have well-developed ovaries. Since only larger females present with higher ovarian development, size (or something correlated with size) appears to be a limiting factor for attaining queen status in P. versicolor. The subordinates can remain potentially fertile and can eventually oviposit, but under extreme dominance conditions, some females reabsorb their oocytes in the nest's postemergence phase. While insemination is not restricted necessarily to the larger females, the smaller females are never inseminated. In aggregations, 75% of the females are inseminated, whereas in founder associations, 85% of the females are inseminated. The queen seeks to discourage reproduction from other females in the nest and thus exerts physical dominance to ensure this. However, ovarian diapause is absent in foundress associations. This provides the advantage that foundresses are able to start new nests and lay eggs immediately after they leave an aggregation.

== Genetic relatedness between colonies ==
Unlike reports of diploid males in other species of Polistes, none of the analyzed P. versicolor males presented with a heterozygous phenotype in any loci, indicating the absence of diploid P. versicolor males. Genetic relatedness within P. versicolor broods is found to be lower than the r = 0.75 for females and r = 0.5 for males that would be expected for haplodiploid species under monogynous conditions; it has been found, however, that P. versicolor doesn't necessarily mate under monogynous conditions. The low genetic relatedness is another consequence of the presence of more than one egg-laying female in about 40% of P. versicolor colonies. This suggests that dominant queens partially lose control of their monopoly on reproduction in the nests, resulting in several other females occasionally laying eggs. Often, the queen monopolizes reproduction in the lower regions of the nest containing the new cells; however, because the queen often remains in these lower regions, there is potential for other females to lay eggs in the upper areas of the nest with the recycled cells. This is supported by the fact that the levels of genetic relatedness are higher among the offspring from the lower areas of the nests compared to the upper areas, where more than one female would be laying eggs in the same area. This occurrence of spatially discontinuous oviposition areas is a sign of both the existence of more than one egg-laying female and territoriality, where each female and her associates take care of their respective broods. Thus, kin recognition is facilitated by territoriality, which compensates for the low kin-recognition ability among nestmates.

== Costs and benefits of sociality ==
Foundress association is a common strategy for P. versicolor. 90.06% of colonies founded by a single female P. versicolor fail; a single foundress will often abandon the nest after the founding phase before the larvae appear to join other foundresses to form associations. While the productivity of individual foundresses is lower in colonies with foundress associations than in colonies with a single foundress, the overall colony itself is more productive in a foundress association—the duration of the pre-emergence phase is reduced and group size is directly related to the number of cells built. Therefore, foundress association appears to be a strategy in which the benefits from protection against parasitism and usurpation, ergonomic synergism, and the increase of survival levels outweigh the costs to the individual foundress’ productivity.

=== Evidence of sociality ===
Evidence for the establishment of sociality as an optimization strategy for P. versicolor can be seen in the frequent shift in females between adjacent nests. Both females with developed eggs in their ovaries and workers can be found shifting between nests, even if the relatedness between the shifting females and the foundresses of the new nest are considered to be low. Despite the low genetic relatedness within and between nests, overt dominance behavior and aggression among females remains significantly lower than that found in other paper wasps, showing how important sociality is as a strategy for P. versicolor.

== Communication ==
P. versicolor is known for its wagging movements as a form of communication within the colony. P. versicolor can waggle with a frequency of 10.6±2.1 Hz (n=190). The wasp walks over the cells of the nest and wiggles its gaster horizontally, with the last abdominal segment suspended over the pupae and larvae. Two wagging periods that last 0.33±0.09 seconds (n=34) each occur within a second. The next pair follows after 10 or 20 seconds. During these wagging movements, two types of sound bursts accompany the movements, with intensities between 70 and 80 dB. Dominant females exhibited 10.2% of the recorded wagging behavior while subordinates were recorded performing only 1.4% of this behavior. Because the wagging movements are displayed significantly more frequently by dominants than subordinates (p<0.01), this behavior has been associated with dominance. It is suspected that the wagging movements may be related to the release of “dominance pheromones” during cell inspection and food exchange with larvae. Therefore, the wagging can be seen as part of a defensive behavior. The subordinates often perform these wagging movements upon the return of a forager to the nest. These wagging movements, along with other communication mechanisms, such as lateral vibration, antennae touching and aggression are social behaviors that P. versicolor use to state the needs of the colony. For example, the wagging movements can signal the arrival of new material into the nest and aggression between workers can be used to stimulate others to increase foraging expeditions.

== Diet ==
The worker P. versicolor tend to complete the bulk of colony feeding. The secretion of the workers’ hypopharyngeal glands is the main constituent of the royal jelly produced by the workers to feed the brood. The development of these glands can be clearly linked to the behaviors carried out by the workers in the nest; queens and males do not possess developed hypopharyngeal glands. After emergence, workers from the 3rd to the 18th day feed almost exclusively on pollen, which provides the protein needed to produce the royal jelly in their hypopharyngeal glands that feeds the rest of the brood. After the 18th day, the workers become foragers, constantly flying to and from the nest to collect food; they switch from feeding on pollen to feeding on nectar, which can better provide for their energetic needs. With the switch to nectar consumption comes a large reduction of their hypopharyngeal glands. However, these structures remain active throughout the lives of these wasps. P. versicolor is generally a predatory wasp, capturing a wide range of insects. While they don't typically have a prey preference, P. versicolor usually feed on insects from the orders Lepidoptera (95.4%) and Coleoptera (1.1%). Chlosyne lacinia saundersii (Lepidoptera: Nymphalidae) is the most collected prey (13.5%).

== Defense ==
Ant attacks represent the largest predatory pressure for P. versicolor. P. versicolor have developed various ways to combat these ants, one of which is through their nest construction. Since the nests are single combs fixed to a substrate by a peduncle, the suspended cells are often protected from attack by ants. If there is an ant attack, nest abandonment is easier and allows for a more rapid escape due to the fact that the wasps do not build envelopes over their nests. In addition, these wasps possess a gland located in the VI abdominal sternite (van de Vecht's gland) that is primarily responsible for making an ant repellent substance. Tufts of hair near the edge of the VI abdominal sternite store and apply the ant repellent, secreting the ant repellent through a rubbing behavior. Although this rubbing behavior occurs throughout the colony cycle, it can be seen most frequently in the pre-emergence stage. Females in the pre-emergence stage are very busy with multiple tasks; therefore, it is more worthwhile for the female to invest in chemical defense in the post-emergence stage. Such active defense often includes alarm behavior, in which the wasps assume an upright stance, open their wings, and point their antennae at the source of their alarm. As P. versicolor wiggle their gasters, alarm pheromones are thought to be released. These alarm behaviors have been linked to the presence of the parasitic Ichneumonidae; these parasitic females inject eggs into the hosts or lay eggs external to the host so that the larvae can attack the host from the outside.

== Agriculture ==
Each colony of P. versicolor is estimated to capture 4,015 insect preys per year. Thus, P. versicolor colonies can prove to be a powerful strategy for pest management of herbivorous insects, especially defoliating caterpillars. By transferring P. versicolor to artificial shelters, these colonies can be managed and used to restore the balance between the species in agricultural ecosystems with relatively minimal costs. In addition to agricultural pest management, P. versicolor can also be a useful pollinator. These social wasps mainly feed on honeydew, fruit juices, and nectar. While foraging for these food supplies, especially nectar, P. versicolor are able to simultaneously pollinate many flowering plants. They are most attracted to species of the plant family Asteraceae, which not only have a large nectar resource concealed at a depth of only a few millimeters, but also include species flowering in May and June, allowing pollen to be collected in addition to nectar.

== Stings ==
P. versicolor contains relatively large amounts of 5-hydroxytryptamine (5-HT) in its venom and venom-containing body parts, such as its stinger. While the stinging apparatus of the larvae and pupae yield equivalent amounts of 5-HT, the stinging apparatus of the adult wasps has a much higher content of 0.87 μg of 5-HT per individual. But the stinging apparatus is not the sole source of 5-HT in these wasps; rather, a relatively large amount of 5-HT has also been found in the heads of P. versicolor. The 5-HT in this venom has been found to play at least two roles: one in defense as a pain-producing agent and the other in the distribution and penetration of the paralyzing components to vulnerable sites in the offender. Acetylcholine, histamine, and kinins are other factors found in the venom that assist the 5-HT in both defense and pain penetration. These factors work in combination to produce pain by depolarizing certain sensory nerve endings as the result of ion movements and changes in permeability. In addition, these proteins work to increase the rate of absorption of the paralyzing venom into tissues and body fluids. This results in the rapid immobilization of the animal or of the certain body parts of the animal receiving the venom.
