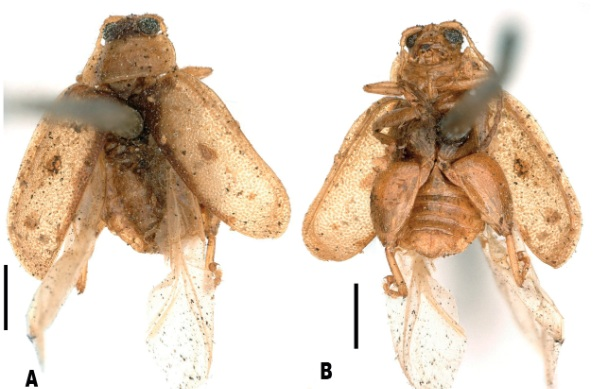

Scientific classification
- Kingdom: Animalia
- Phylum: Arthropoda
- Class: Insecta
- Order: Coleoptera
- Suborder: Polyphaga
- Infraorder: Cucujiformia
- Family: Chrysomelidae
- Tribe: Alticini
- Genus: Capraita
- Species: C. suturalis

Binomial name
- Capraita suturalis (Fabricius, 1801)

Synonyms
- Galleruca atomaria Fabricius, 1801

= Capraita suturalis =

Species of beetle

Capraita suturalis is a species of flea beetle in the family Chrysomelidae.
