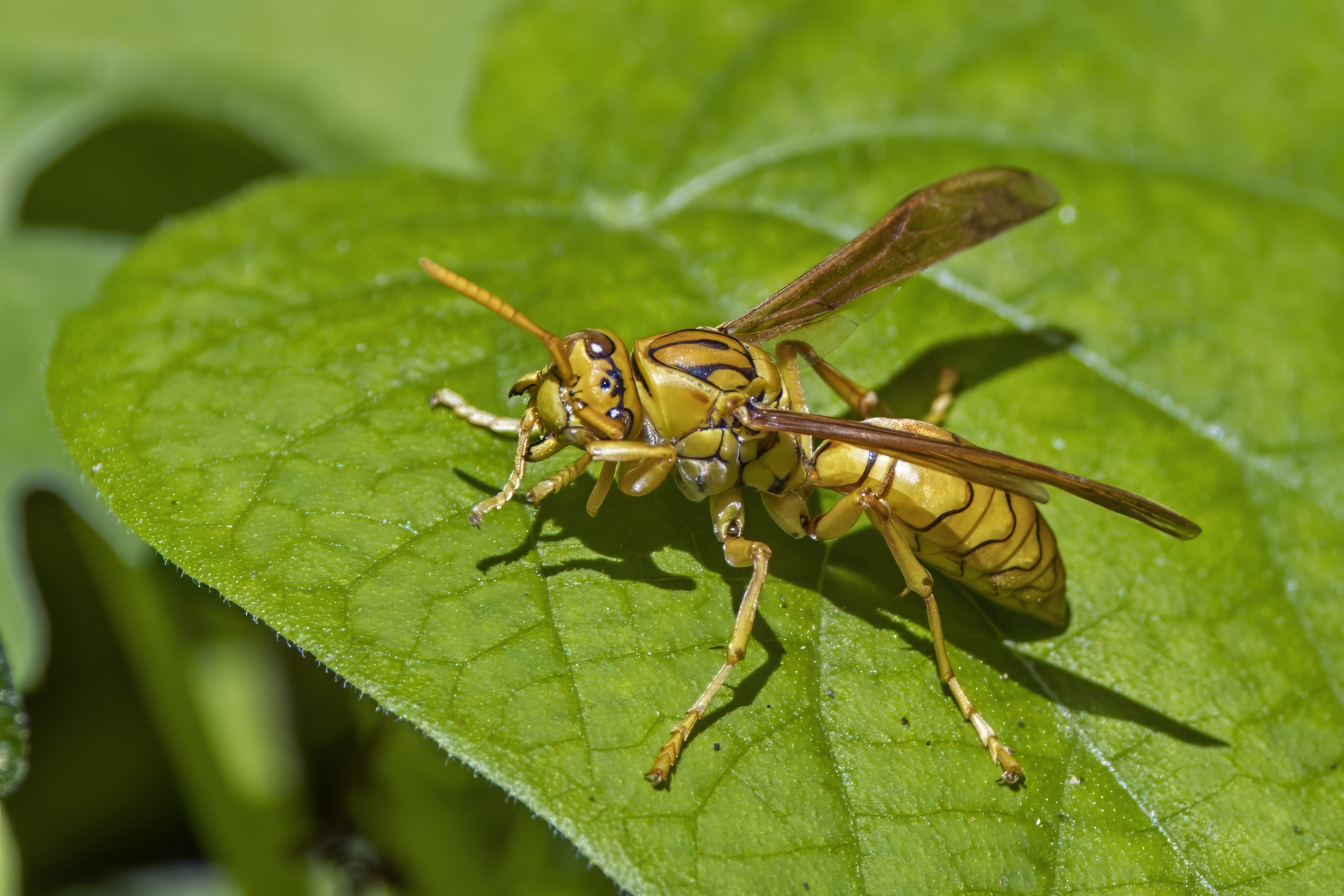
- on Rarotonga, Cook Islands

Scientific classification
- Kingdom: Animalia
- Phylum: Arthropoda
- Class: Insecta
- Order: Hymenoptera
- Family: Vespidae
- Subfamily: Polistinae
- Tribe: Polistini
- Genus: Polistes
- Species: P. olivaceus

Binomial name
- Polistes olivaceus DeGeer, 1773

Synonyms
- Vespa olivacea (DeGeer, 1773); Polistes hebraeus (Fabricius, 1787); Polistes macaensis (Fabricius, 1793)

= Polistes olivaceus =

Species of wasp

Polistes olivaceus, also known as the yellow oriental paper wasp or Macao paper wasp, is a species of paper wasp. In the Cook Islands, it is known in English simply as the yellow paper wasp (Note: Not to be confused with Polistes flavus, Polistes versicolor, or Polistes wattii.), while its Cook Island Maori name is "Rango Patia" or other variation depending on the island.

== Distribution ==
It is native to India and East Asia, but also introduced to East Africa, and Pacific island nations such as the Marquesas Islands, Easter Island, Hawaii, Seychelles, and the Cook Islands, in the South Pacific.
