= Tephronota =

Scientific classification
- Domain: Eukaryota
- Kingdom: Animalia
- Phylum: Arthropoda
- Class: Insecta
- Order: Diptera
- Family: Ulidiidae
- Genus: Tephronota; Loew, 1868

Genus of flies

Tephronota is a genus of picture-winged flies in the family Ulidiidae.

== Species ==
- Tephronota canadensis
- Tephronota humilis
