= Euphranta mikado =

Scientific classification
- Kingdom: Animalia
- Phylum: Arthropoda
- Clade: Pancrustacea
- Class: Insecta
- Order: Diptera
- Family: Tephritidae
- Genus: Euphranta
- Species: E. mikado

Binomial name
- Euphranta mikado (Matsumura, 1916)

Species of fruit fly

Euphranta mikado is a species of tephritid or fruit fly in the genus Euphranta of the family Tephritidae.
