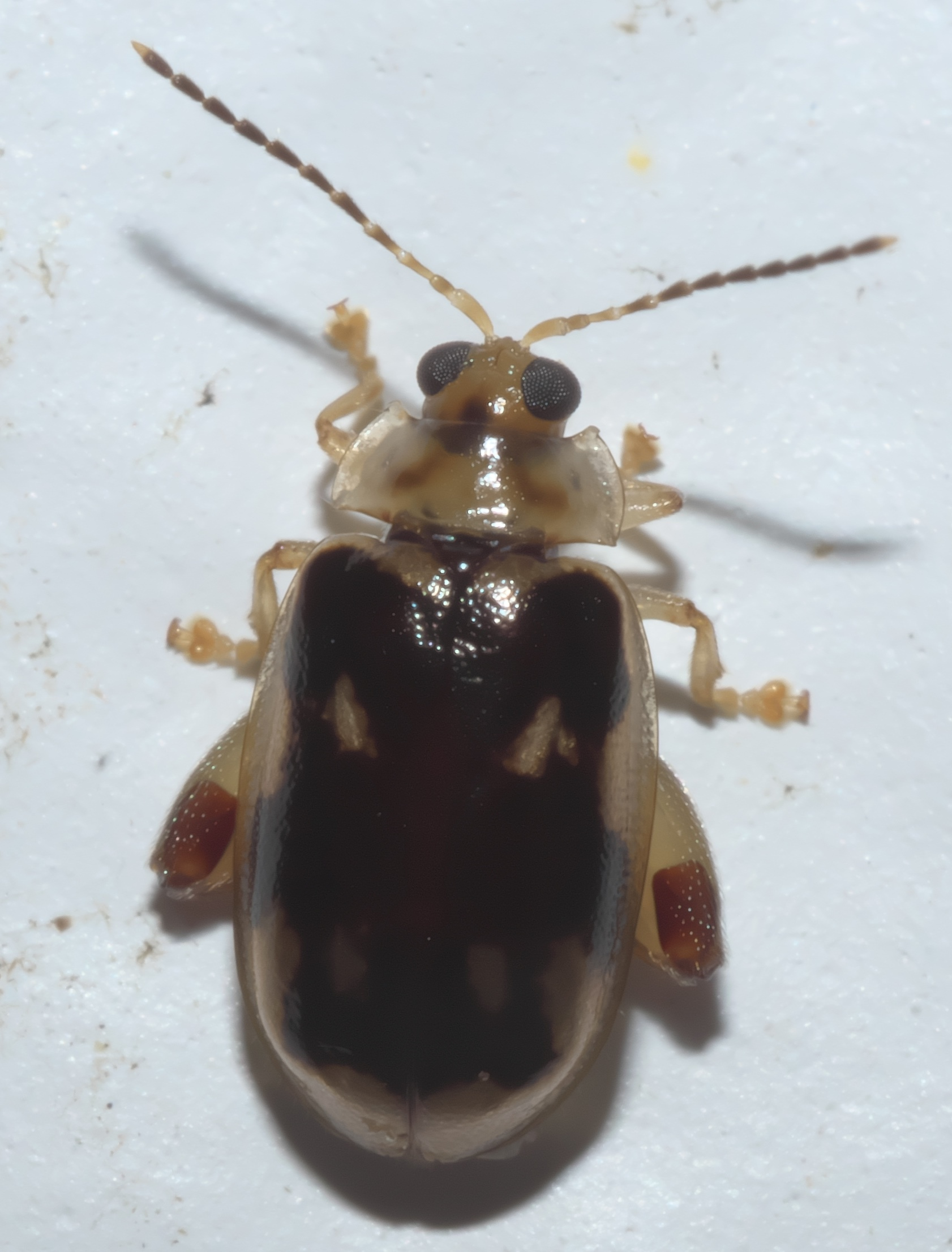

Scientific classification
- Kingdom: Animalia
- Phylum: Arthropoda
- Class: Insecta
- Order: Coleoptera
- Suborder: Polyphaga
- Infraorder: Cucujiformia
- Family: Chrysomelidae
- Tribe: Alticini
- Genus: Capraita
- Species: C. scalaris

Binomial name
- Capraita scalaris (F. E. Melsheimer, 1847)

= Capraita scalaris =

Species of beetle

Capraita scalaris is a species of flea beetle in the family Chrysomelidae. It is found in North America.

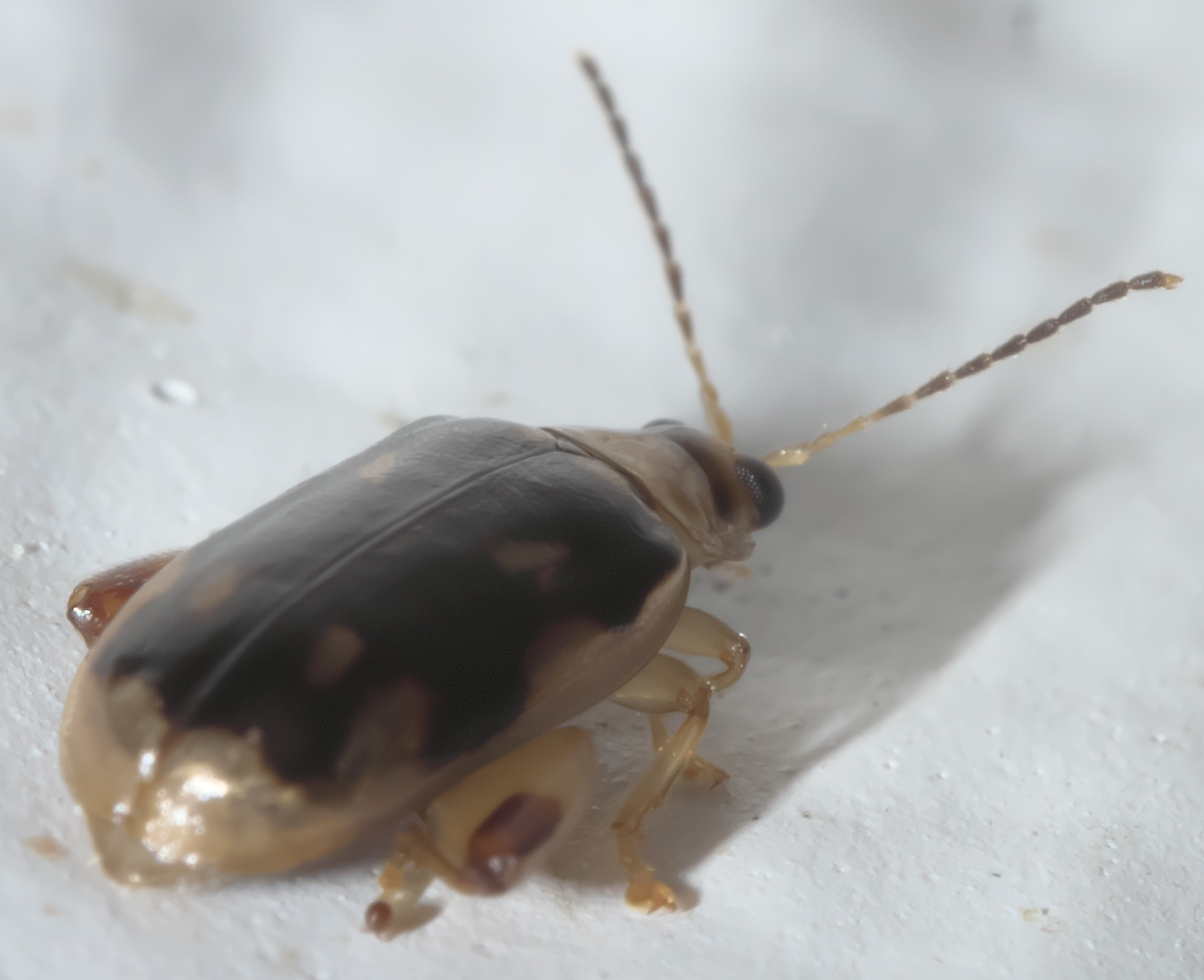

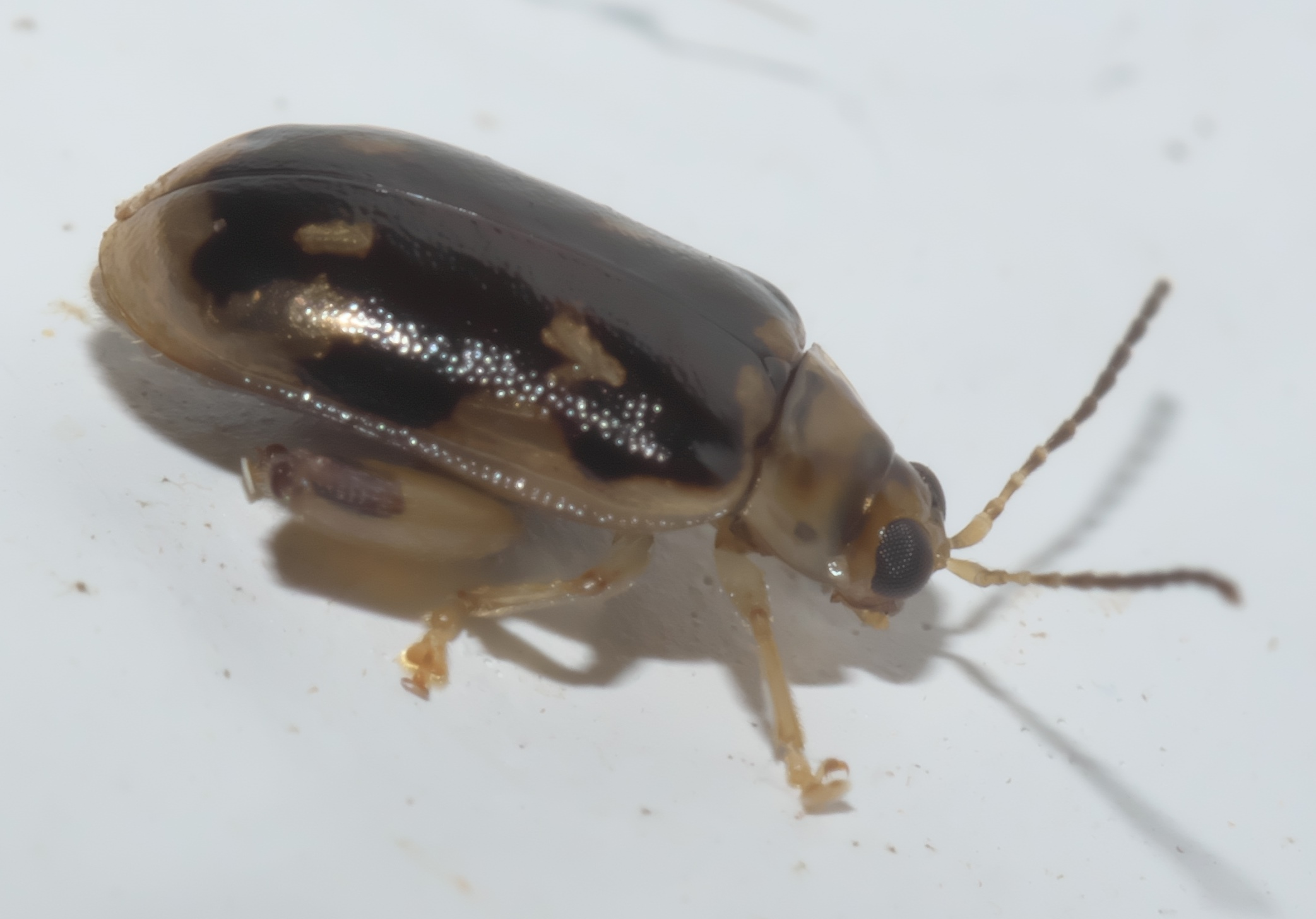
