= Euphranta connexa =

Scientific classification
- Kingdom: Animalia
- Phylum: Arthropoda
- Clade: Pancrustacea
- Class: Insecta
- Order: Diptera
- Family: Tephritidae
- Genus: Euphranta
- Species: E. connexa

Binomial name
- Euphranta connexa (Fabricius, 1794)

Synonyms
- Euphranta conexa Foote, 1984; Cephalia caloptera Bigot, 1886; Tephritis dorsalis Macquart, 1851; Trypeta alcinoe Walker, 1849; Ortalis zetterstedti Fallen, 1820

Species of fly

Euphranta connexa is a species of insect in the family Tephritidae. It was described in 1794 by Fabricius.
