= Euphranta atrata =

Scientific classification
- Kingdom: Animalia
- Phylum: Arthropoda
- Clade: Pancrustacea
- Class: Insecta
- Order: Diptera
- Family: Tephritidae
- Genus: Euphranta
- Species: E. atrata

Binomial name
- Euphranta atrata Hardy, 1974

Species of insect

Euphranta atrata is a species of insect in the family Tephritidae.
