= Euphranta siruvani =

Scientific classification
- Domain: Eukaryota
- Kingdom: Animalia
- Phylum: Arthropoda
- Class: Insecta
- Order: Diptera
- Family: Tephritidae
- Genus: Euphranta
- Species: E. siruvani

Binomial name
- Euphranta siruvani David et al., 2020

Species of fly

Euphranta siruvani, is a species of fruit fly in the family Tephritidae. This species is reported from the Siruvani which is an ecological hot spot located in the Western Ghats of India. This species has been collected from a non-forest area near Siruvani in Coimbatore district of Tamil Nadu, India. This species is differentiated from other species of Euphranta by the presence of an V-shaped black band on the wing and prominent sub-apical band connected to the apical black patch.
