= Tephronota humilis =

Scientific classification
- Domain: Eukaryota
- Kingdom: Animalia
- Phylum: Arthropoda
- Class: Insecta
- Order: Diptera
- Family: Ulidiidae
- Genus: Tephronota
- Species: T. humilis

Binomial name
- Tephronota humilis Loew, 1873

Species of fly

Tephronota humilis is a species of ulidiid or picture-winged fly in the genus Tephronota of the family Tephritidae.
