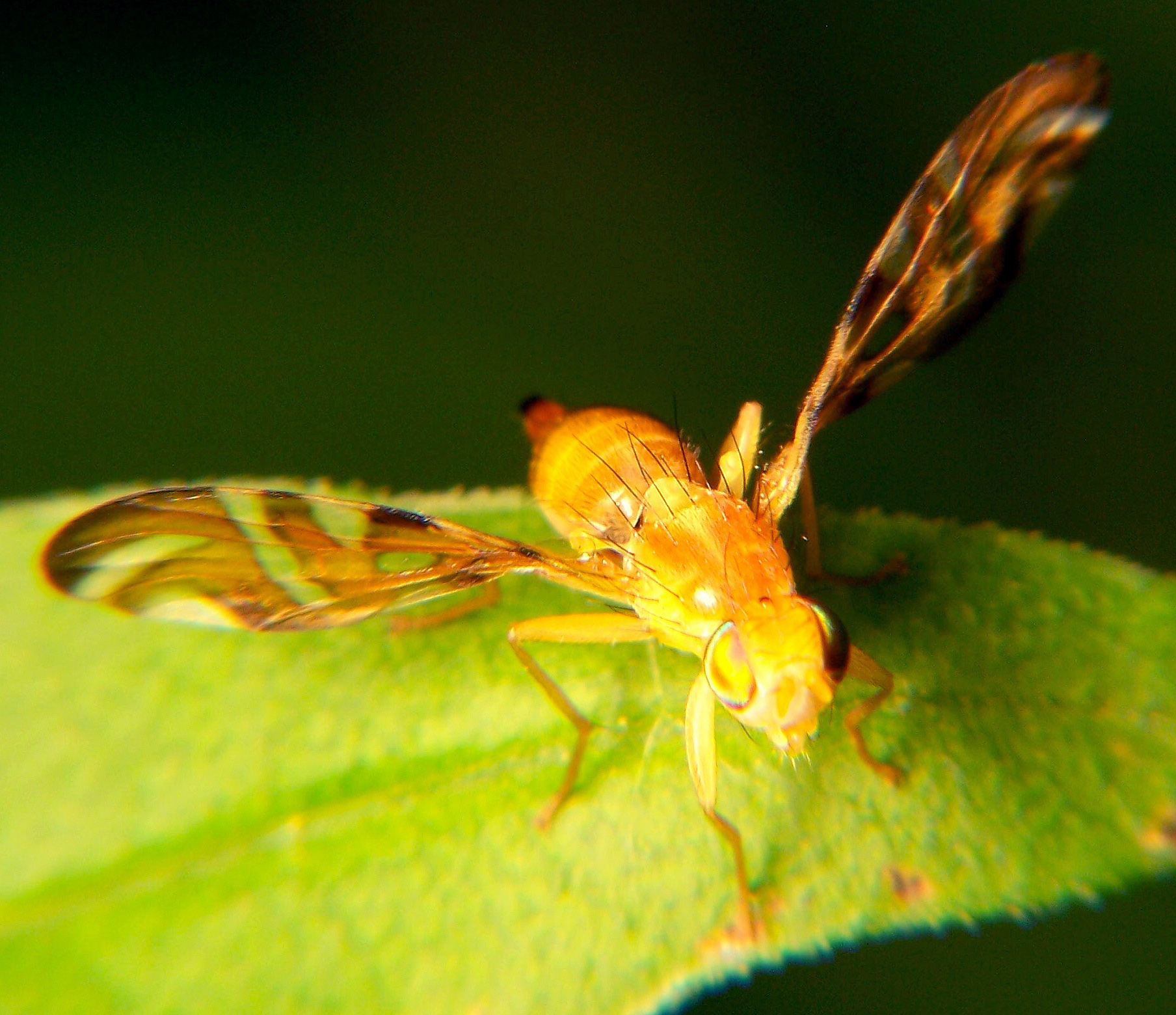
- Strauzia longipennis, Adult female fruit fly

Scientific classification
- Kingdom: Animalia
- Phylum: Arthropoda
- Clade: Pancrustacea
- Class: Insecta
- Order: Diptera
- Family: Tephritidae
- Genus: Euphranta; Loew, 1862

Synonyms
- Lagarosia Wulp, 1891

= Euphranta =

Genus of flies

Euphranta is a genus of fruit flies in the family Tephritidae. There are at least 90 described species in Euphranta.

== Species ==
- Euphranta apicalis Hendel, 1915
- Euphranta athertonia Permkam & Hancock, 1995
- Euphranta atrata Hardy, 1974
- Euphranta balteata Hardy, 1981
- Euphranta basalis (Walker, 1865)
- Euphranta bifasciata Hardy, 1981
- Euphranta bilineata Hardy, 1983
- Euphranta bimaculata (Malloch, 1939)
- Euphranta bischofi (Kertész, 1901)
- Euphranta borneana Hardy, 1983
- Euphranta brunneifemur Hardy, 1983
- Euphranta burtoni Hardy, 1973
- Euphranta camelliae (Ito, 1949)
- Euphranta canadensis (Loew, 1873) (currant fruit fly)
- Euphranta canangae Hardy, 1955
- Euphranta cassiae (Munro, 1938)
- Euphranta cerberae Hancock & Drew, 1995
- Euphranta chrysopila Hendel, 1913
- Euphranta conjuncta Hendel, 1928
- Euphranta connexa (Fabricius, 1794)
- Euphranta convergens Hardy, 1974
- Euphranta corticicola (Hering, 1952)
- Euphranta crux (Fabricius, 1794)
- Euphranta dissoluta (Bezzi, 1913)
- Euphranta ferenigra Hardy, 1970
- Euphranta figurata (Walker, 1856)
- Euphranta flavizona Hardy, 1983
- Euphranta flavorufa Hering, 1936
- Euphranta flavoscutellata Hardy, 1970
- Euphranta hainanensis (Zia, 1955)
- Euphranta incompleta Hardy, 1983
- Euphranta japonica (Ito, 1947)
- Euphranta jucunda Hendel, 1915
- Euphranta lacteata (Wulp, 1891)
- Euphranta laosica Hardy, 1973
- Euphranta latifasciata Hardy, 1983
- Euphranta leichhardtiae Permkam & Hancock, 1995
- Euphranta lemniscata (Enderlein, 1911)
- Euphranta licenti Zia, 1938
- Euphranta linocierae Hardy, 1951
- Euphranta longicauda Shiraki, 1952
- Euphranta luteifasciata (Senior-White, 1922)
- Euphranta macularis (Wiedemann, 1830)
- Euphranta maculifacies Hardy, 1973
- Euphranta maculifemur (Meijere, 1924)
- Euphranta maculifrons (Meijere, 1914)
- Euphranta maculipennis Hardy, 1983
- Euphranta marginata Hardy, 1983
- Euphranta marina Permkam & Hancock, 1995
- Euphranta maxima Hering, 1941
- Euphranta mediofusca (Hering, 1941)
- Euphranta meringae Permkam & Hancock, 1995
- Euphranta mexicana Norrbom, 1993
- Euphranta mikado (Matsumura, 1916)
- Euphranta minor Hendel, 1928
- Euphranta moluccensis Hardy, 1983
- Euphranta mulgravea Permkam & Hancock, 1995
- Euphranta myxopyrae Hancock & Drew, 1994
- Euphranta naevifrons Hering, 1941
- Euphranta nigrescens (Zia, 1937)
- Euphranta nigripeda (Bezzi, 1913)
- Euphranta nigroapicalis Hardy, 1983
- Euphranta nigrocingulata (Hering, 1938)
- Euphranta notata Hardy, 1974
- Euphranta numeralis Permkam & Hancock, 1995
- Euphranta ocellata Hardy, 1974
- Euphranta ortalidina (Portschinsky, 1892)
- Euphranta oshimensis (Shiraki, 1933)
- Euphranta palawanica Hardy, 1974
- Euphranta pallida Hardy, 1983
- Euphranta perkinsi Hardy, 1983
- Euphranta quadrimaculata Hardy, 1983
- Euphranta quatei Hardy, 1983
- Euphranta rudis (Walker, 1856)
- Euphranta scutellata Malloch, 1939
- Euphranta sedlaceki Hardy, 1983
- Euphranta separata (Ito, 1949)
- Euphranta sexsignata Hendel, 1915
- Euphranta signatifacies Hardy, 1981
- Euphranta simonthomasi Hardy, 1983
- Euphranta skinneri Hardy, 1955
- Euphranta solaniferae Hancock & Drew, 1994
- Euphranta solitaria Hardy, 1983
- Euphranta songkhla Hancock & Drew, 1994
- Euphranta siruvani David, Hancock & Sankararaman, 2020
- Euphranta stenopeza Hardy, 1974
- Euphranta suspiciosa (Hering, 1938)
- Euphranta tanyoura Hardy, 1981
- Euphranta ternaria Permkam & Hancock, 1995
- Euphranta toxoneura (Loew, 1846)
- Euphranta transiens (Walker, 1860)
- Euphranta transmontana (Ito, 1984)
- Euphranta tricolor Hardy, 1983
- Euphranta turpiniae Hancock & Drew, 1994
- Euphranta unifasciata Hardy, 1981
- Euphranta variabilis (Kertész, 1901)
- Euphranta vitabilis Hardy, 1970
- Euphranta zeylanica (Senior-White, 1921)
