= Capraita nigrosignata =

Scientific classification
- Kingdom: Animalia
- Phylum: Arthropoda
- Class: Insecta
- Order: Coleoptera
- Suborder: Polyphaga
- Infraorder: Cucujiformia
- Family: Chrysomelidae
- Tribe: Alticini
- Genus: Capraita
- Species: C. nigrosignata

Binomial name
- Capraita nigrosignata (Schaeffer, 1920)

Species of beetle

Capraita nigrosignata, the germander flea beetle, is a species of flea beetle in the family Chrysomelidae. It is found in Central America and North America.
