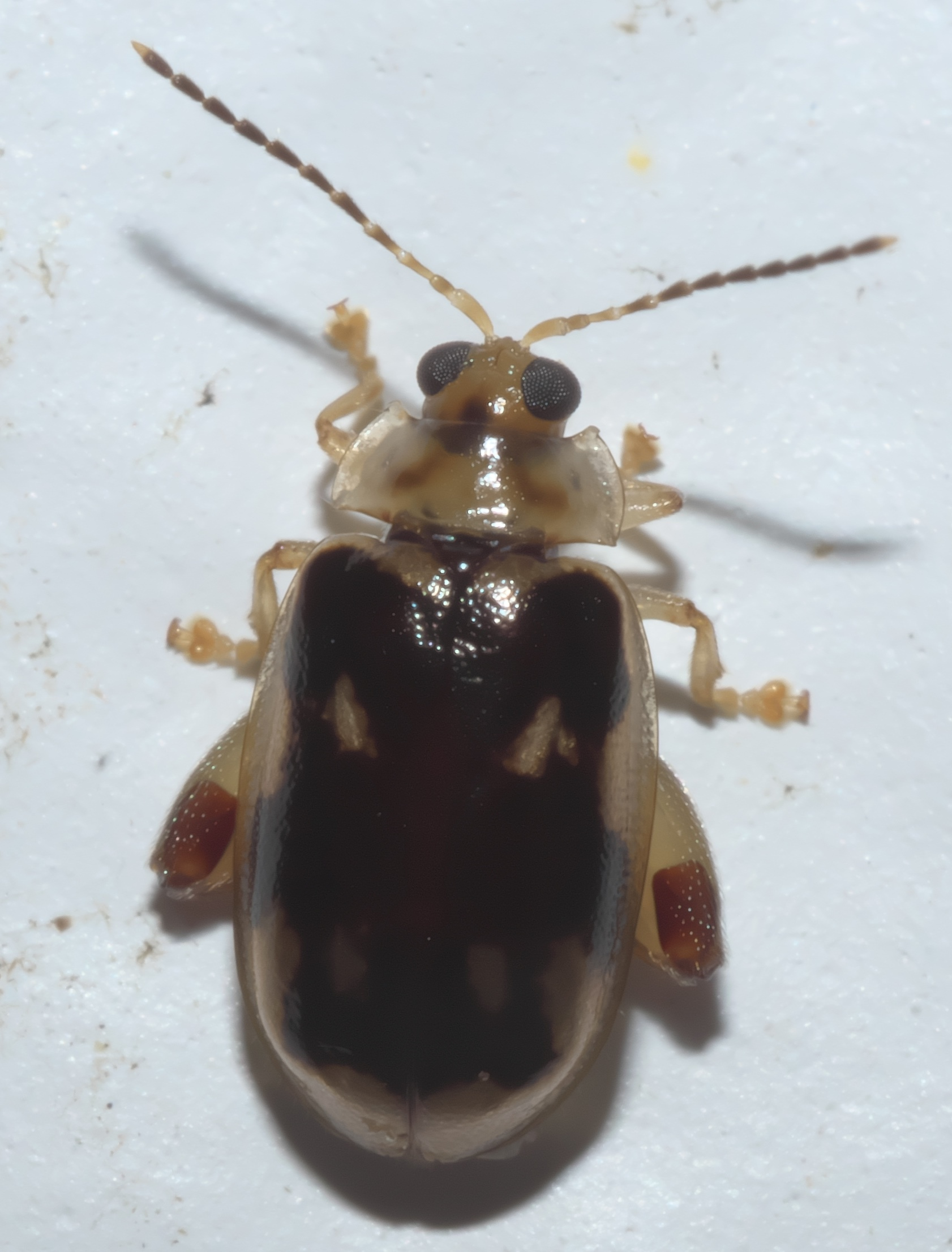
- Capraita scalaris

Scientific classification
- Kingdom: Animalia
- Phylum: Arthropoda
- Class: Insecta
- Order: Coleoptera
- Suborder: Polyphaga
- Infraorder: Cucujiformia
- Superfamily: Chrysomeloidea
- Family: Chrysomelidae
- Subfamily: Galerucinae
- Tribe: Alticini
- Genus: Capraita; J. Bechyné, 1957

= Capraita =

Genus of beetles

Capraita is a genus of flea beetles in the family Chrysomelidae. There are some 60 described species in the Nearctic and Neotropics.

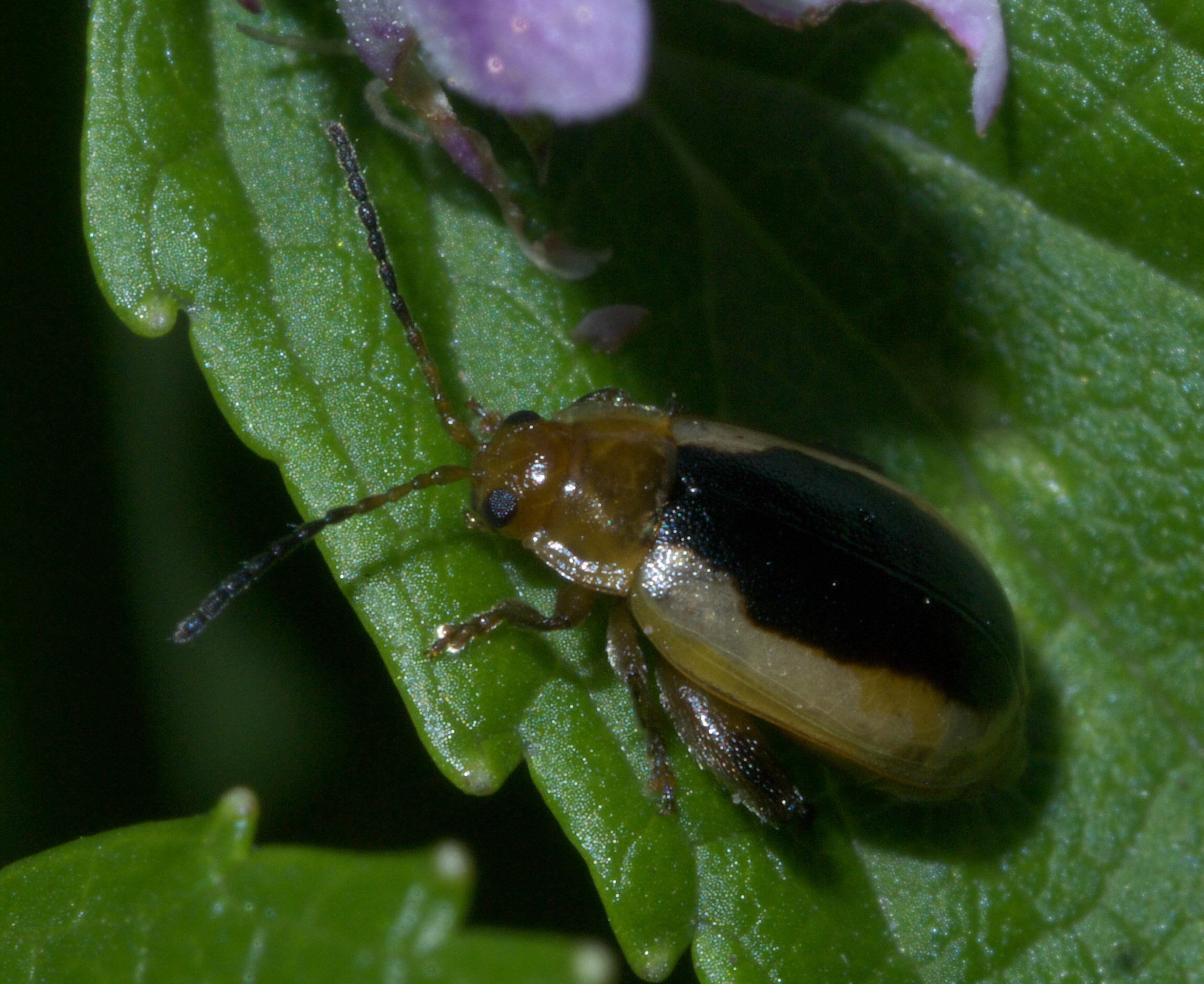
Capraita thyamoides

== Selected species ==
- Capraita carinimera
- Capraita circumdata (Randall, 1838)
- Capraita cuyaba Bechyné, 1957
- Capraita durangoensis (Jacoby, 1892)
- Capraita encarpalis
- Capraita flavida (Horn, 1889)
- Capraita indigoptera (J. L. LeConte, 1878)
- Capraita nigrosignata (Schaeffer, 1920) (germander flea beetle)
- Capraita obsidiana (Fabricius, 1801)
- Capraita pervittata (Blake, 1927)
- Capraita punzonensis
- Capraita quercata (Fabricius, 1801)
- Capraita saltatra (Blatchley, 1923)
- Capraita scalaris (F. E. Melsheimer, 1847)
- Capraita sexmaculata (Illiger, 1807) (Charlie Brown flea beetle)
- Capraita spilonota (Blake, 1927)
- Capraita stichocephala
- Capraita sublaevis
- Capraita subvittata (Horn, 1889)
- Capraita suturalis (Fabricius, 1801)
- Capraita texana (Crotch, 1873)
- Capraita thelma
- Capraita thyamoides (Crotch, 1873)
- Capraita virkkii
