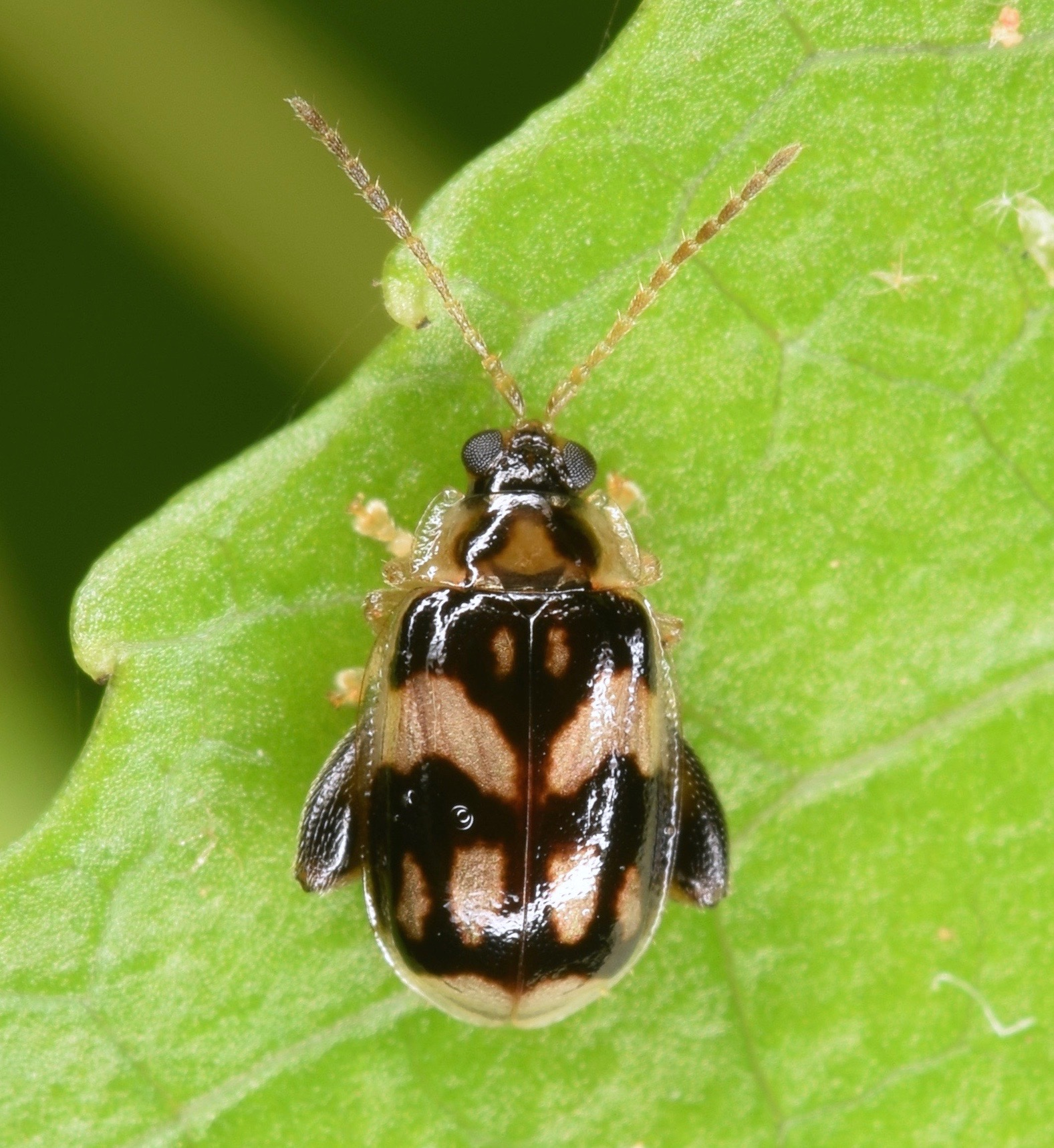

Scientific classification
- Kingdom: Animalia
- Phylum: Arthropoda
- Class: Insecta
- Order: Coleoptera
- Suborder: Polyphaga
- Infraorder: Cucujiformia
- Family: Chrysomelidae
- Genus: Capraita
- Species: C. obsidiana

Binomial name
- Capraita obsidiana (Fabricius, 1801)

= Capraita obsidiana =

Species of beetle

Capraita obsidiana is a species of flea beetle in the family Chrysomelidae. It is found in North America.
