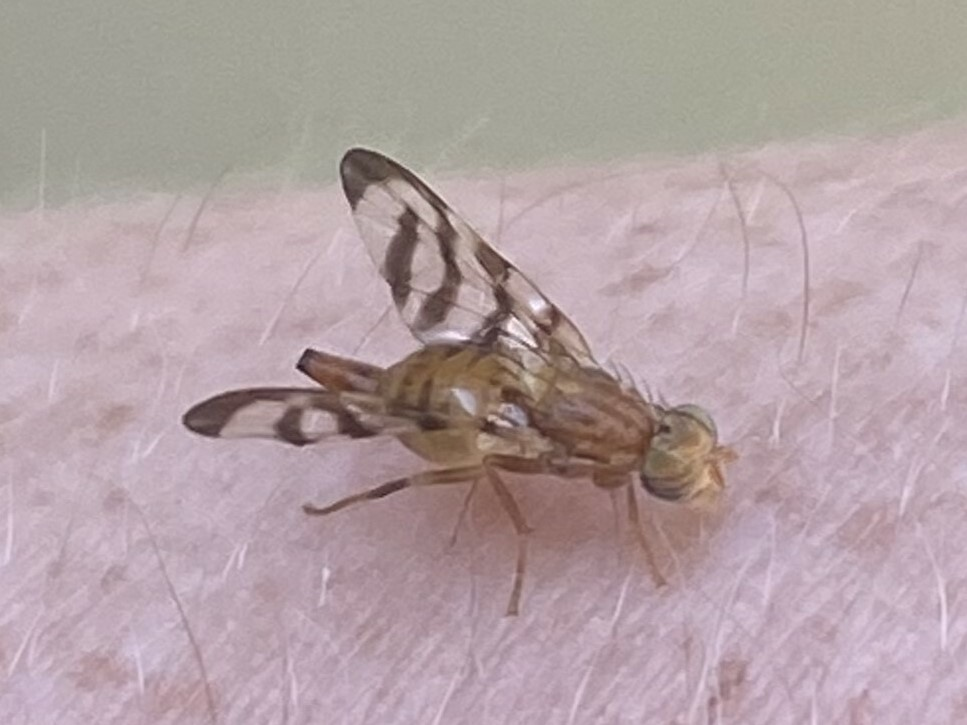

Scientific classification
- Kingdom: Animalia
- Phylum: Arthropoda
- Class: Insecta
- Order: Diptera
- Family: Tephritidae
- Genus: Euphranta
- Species: E. canadensis

Binomial name
- Euphranta canadensis (Loew, 1873)

Synonyms
- Epochra lunifera Hering, 1940; Trypeta canadensis Loew, 1873

= Euphranta canadensis =

Species of fly

Euphranta canadensis, commonly known as the currant fruit fly, is a species of fruit fly in the family Tephritidae.
