= Tephronota canadensis =

Scientific classification
- Domain: Eukaryota
- Kingdom: Animalia
- Phylum: Arthropoda
- Class: Insecta
- Order: Diptera
- Family: Ulidiidae
- Genus: Tephronota
- Species: T. canadensis

Binomial name
- Tephronota canadensis Johnson, 1902

Species of fly

Tephronota canadensis is a species of ulidiid or picture-winged fly in the genus Tephronota of the family Tephritidae.
