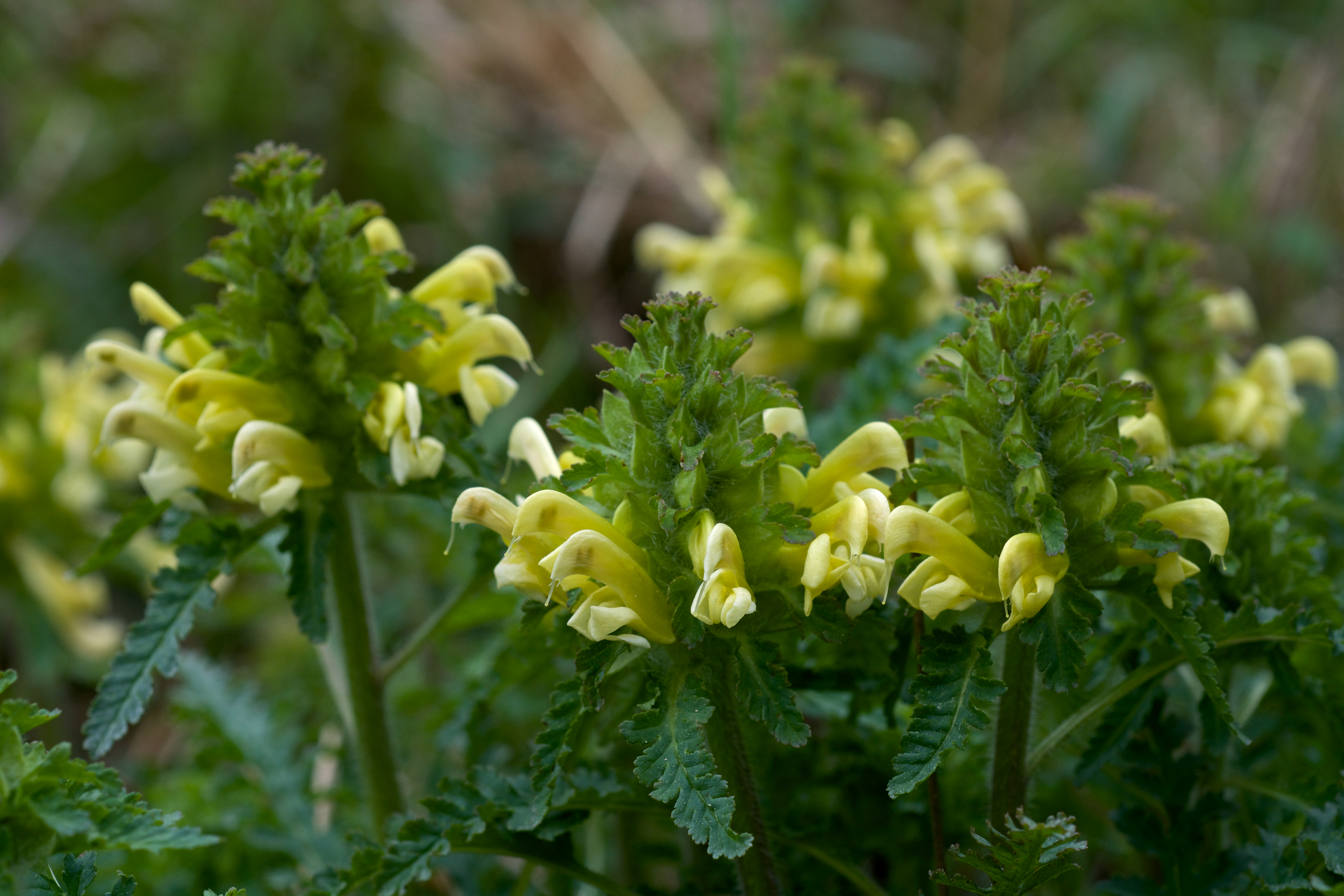

Conservation status
- Secure (NatureServe)

Scientific classification
- Kingdom: Plantae
- Clade: Tracheophytes
- Clade: Angiosperms
- Clade: Eudicots
- Clade: Asterids
- Order: Lamiales
- Family: Orobanchaceae
- Genus: Pedicularis
- Species: P. canadensis

Binomial name
- Pedicularis canadensis L.

Synonyms
- List: Enslenia bibracteata; Nelensia bibracteata; Pedicularis aequinoctialis; Pedicularis asplenifolia; Pedicularis fluviatilis; Pedicularis gladiata

= Pedicularis canadensis =

Plant species in the family

Pedicularis canadensis, commonly called Canadian lousewort or wood betony, is a flowering plant in the family Orobanchaceae. It is native to North America, where it is found in southeastern Canada, the eastern United States, and eastern Mexico. It has a wide-ranging natural habitat, being found in mesic to dry, forests, woodlands, and prairies.

== Description ==
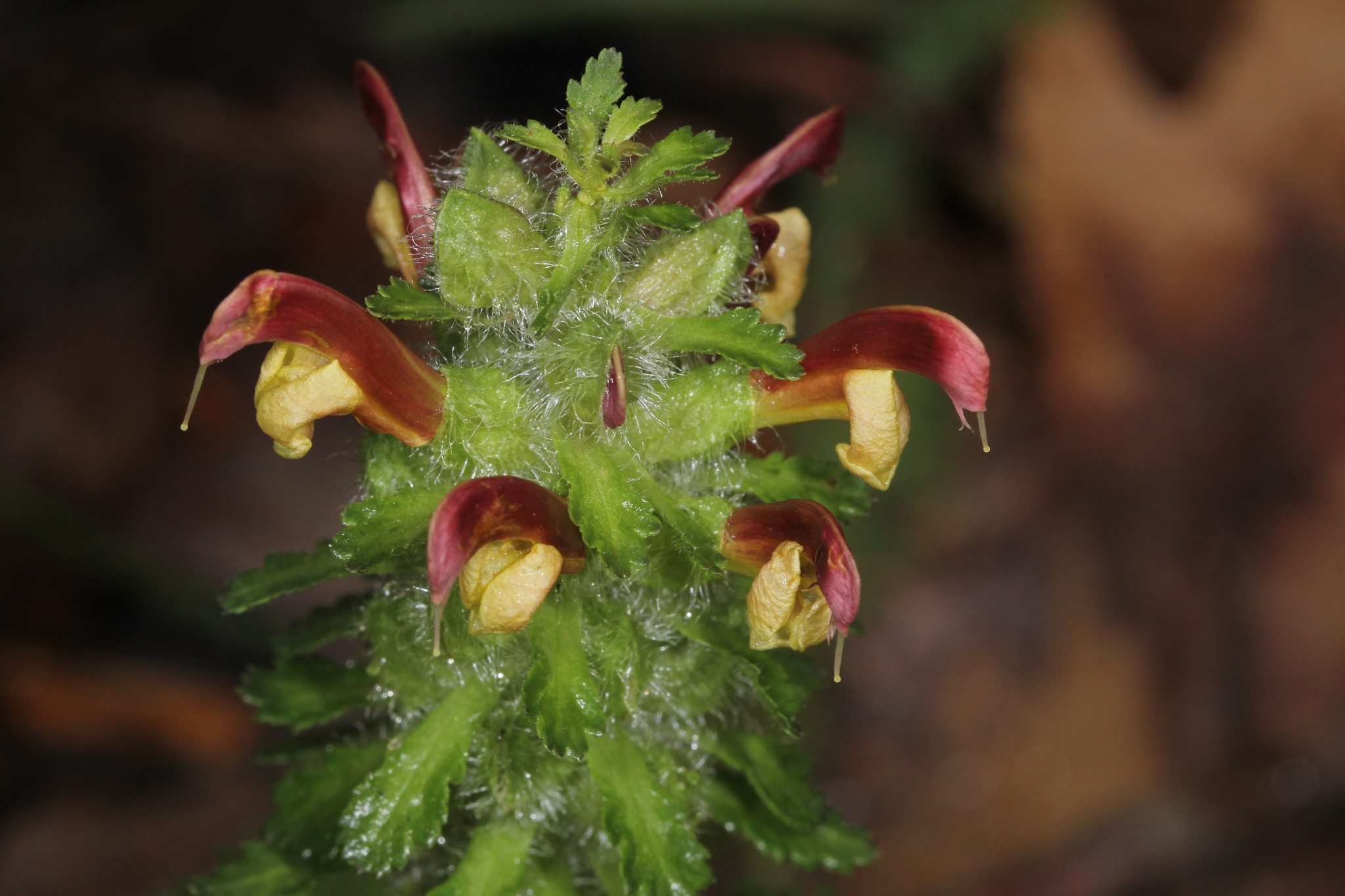
Red and yellow form

Pedicularis canadensis is a perennial, clonal, herbaceous plant, growing to 30 cm (12 in) tall. It has long, soft, hairy leaves (many are basal, growing tufted from roots), some 12 to 36 cm (4.7 to 14.2 in) long, deeply incised and toothed, often reddish-purple under sunlight. It blooms in the spring to summer, between April and June. It produces a broad whorl of tubular, hooded flowers on top of a segmented stalk. The flowers range in color from a greenish-yellow to purplish-red, clustered on short, dense spikes. They are pollinated by bumblebees. The fruit is a long brown seed capsule, which disperses through explosive dehiscence.

== Taxonomy ==
The genus name Pedicularis is from Latin meaning "of or relating to lice", from the belief that cows caught lice when grazing in pastures with the European Pedicularis palustris. The specific epithet canadensis refers to Canada. It was formerly included in the family Scrophulariaceae but is now considered to be in Orobanchaceae.

It has no accepted subspecies according to Plants of the World Online, but has one included in its fifteen synonyms.

Table of Synonyms
Name	Year	Rank	Notes
Enslenia bibracteata Raf.	1817	species	= het.
Nelensia bibracteata (Raf.) Poir.	1823	species	= het.
Pedicularis aequinoctialis Kunth	1818	species	= het.
Pedicularis asplenifolia Croom	1834	species	= het., nom. nud.
Pedicularis canadensis f. albescens Steyerm.	1952	form	= het.
Pedicularis canadensis f. bicolor Farw.	1928	form	= het.
Pedicularis canadensis var. dobbsii Fernald	1946	variety	= het.
Pedicularis canadensis f. flava Farw.	1928	form	= het.
Pedicularis canadensis subsp. fluviatilis (A.Heller) W.A.Weber	1976	subspecies	= het.
Pedicularis canadensis var. fluviatilis (A.Heller) J.F.Macbr.	1918	variety	= het.
Pedicularis canadensis var. gladiata (Michx.) Alph.Wood	1845	variety	= het.
Pedicularis canadensis f. praeclara A.H.Moore	1914	form	= het.
Pedicularis canadensis f. typica Farw.	1928	form	≡ hom., not validly publ.
Pedicularis fluviatilis A.Heller	1898	species	= het.
Pedicularis gladiata Michx.	1803	species	= het.
Notes: ≡ homotypic synonym; = heterotypic synonym

== Distribution and habitat ==
Wood betony is broadly distributed across eastern North America, from Quebec west to Manitoba, south to Mexico, and east to Florida. It occurs in a variety of habitats, including mesic to dry prairies, savannas, barrens, and woodlands. In the Chicago area it is considered a conservative species, with a coefficient of conservatism of 9.

== Ecology ==
Pedicularis canadensis is a hemiparasite, attaching to the roots of diverse species, but also producing chlorophyll on its own. Its roots also have a symbiotic relationship with a fungus that helps it gather nutrients. It has been shown to be correlated with increase in floristic quality in prairies.

A leaf beetle, Capraita circumdata has been collected from inside of the flowers. Several ants have been recorded visiting the flowers, including: Crematogaster cerasi, Formica incerta, Formica subsericea, and Lasius alienus. Bees documented visiting the flowers of wood betony include Augochlorella aurata, Bombus auricomus, Bombus bimaculatus, Bombus fervidus, Bombus griseocollis, Bombus impatiens, Bombus vagans, Halictus confusus, and Lasioglossum anomalum.

== Uses ==
This plant was eaten by the Iroquois as a vegetable, often as a soup. It was added to oats and used as horse feed by Native Americans.

American Indians used a root infusion as a remedy for stomachaches, diarrhea, anemia and heart trouble and made a poultice for swellings, tumors and sore muscles.

== Folklore ==
The Menomini called the root "enticer root" and carried it as a charm when determined on seducing the opposite sex. The root was also used to heal broken marriages by placing it in food the couple would both eat, hoping its magic would rekindle romance.
