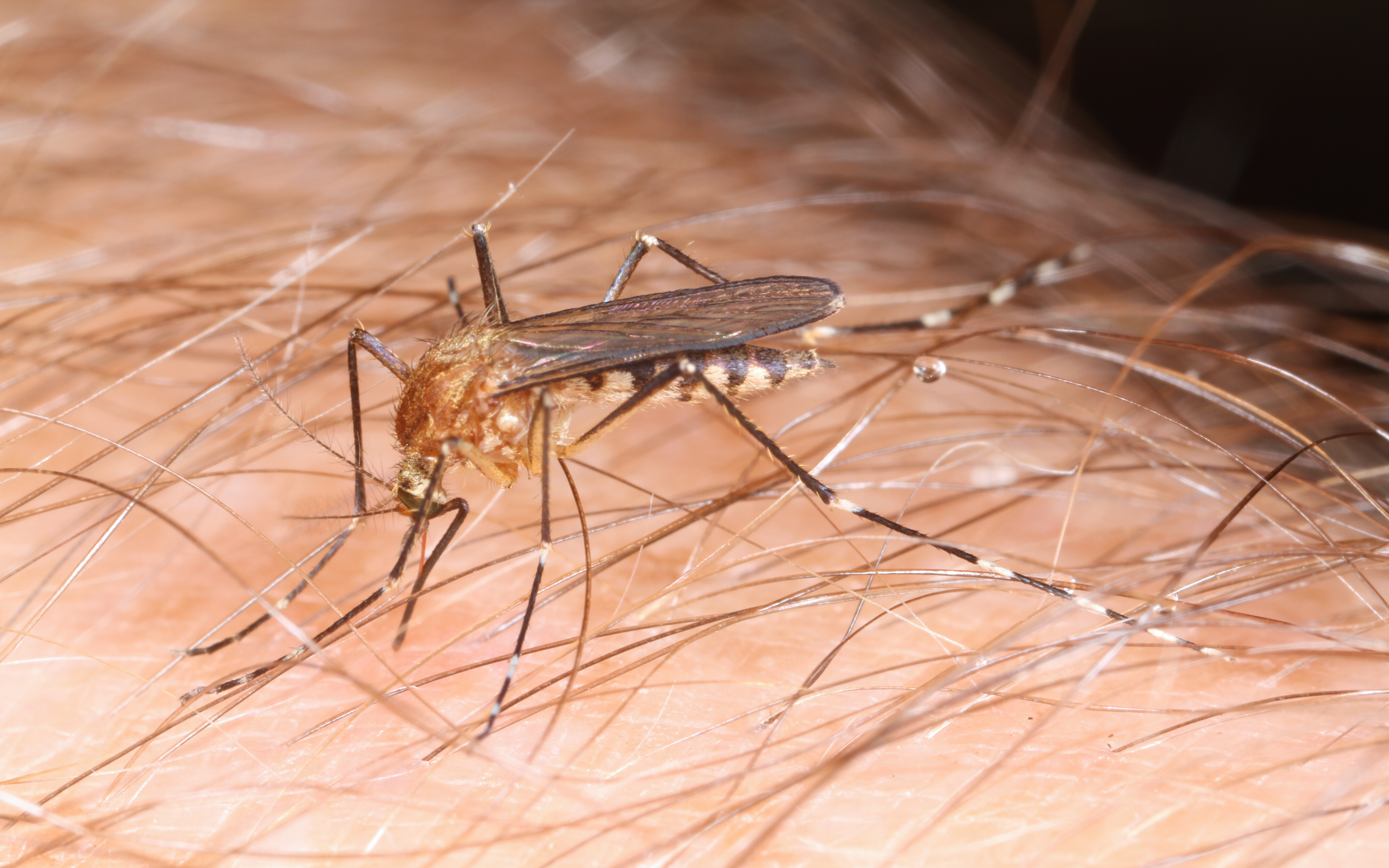

Conservation status
- Secure (NatureServe)

Scientific classification
- Kingdom: Animalia
- Phylum: Arthropoda
- Clade: Pancrustacea
- Class: Insecta
- Order: Diptera
- Family: Culicidae
- Genus: Aedes
- Subgenus: Ochlerotatus
- Species: A. canadensis

Binomial name
- Aedes canadensis (Theobald, 1901)

Synonyms
- Culex canadensis Theobald, 1901; Culex nivitarsis Coquillett, 1904; Ochlerotatus canadensis (Theobald, 1901)

= Aedes canadensis =

Species of mosquito

Aedes canadensis, the woodland pool mosquito, is an aggressive, day biting mosquito that can be a vector of a number of diseases which is found mainly in eastern North America.

== Taxonomy ==
Aedes canadensis was originally described as Culex canadensis by the British entomologist Frederick Vincent Theobald in his 1901 monograph entitled A monograph of the Culicidae of the World, published by the British Museum (Natural History), from specimens collected in Ontario. In recent revisions of the genus Aedes it was found that the genus was paraphyletic and workers suggested that the genus be divided into two genera. A. canadensis was placed in the newly raised genus Ochlerotatus by these workers, these studies also placed it in its own monotypic sub-genus Culicada. Two subspecies are recognized.

- A. canadensis canadensis (Theobald, 1901) from northern North America

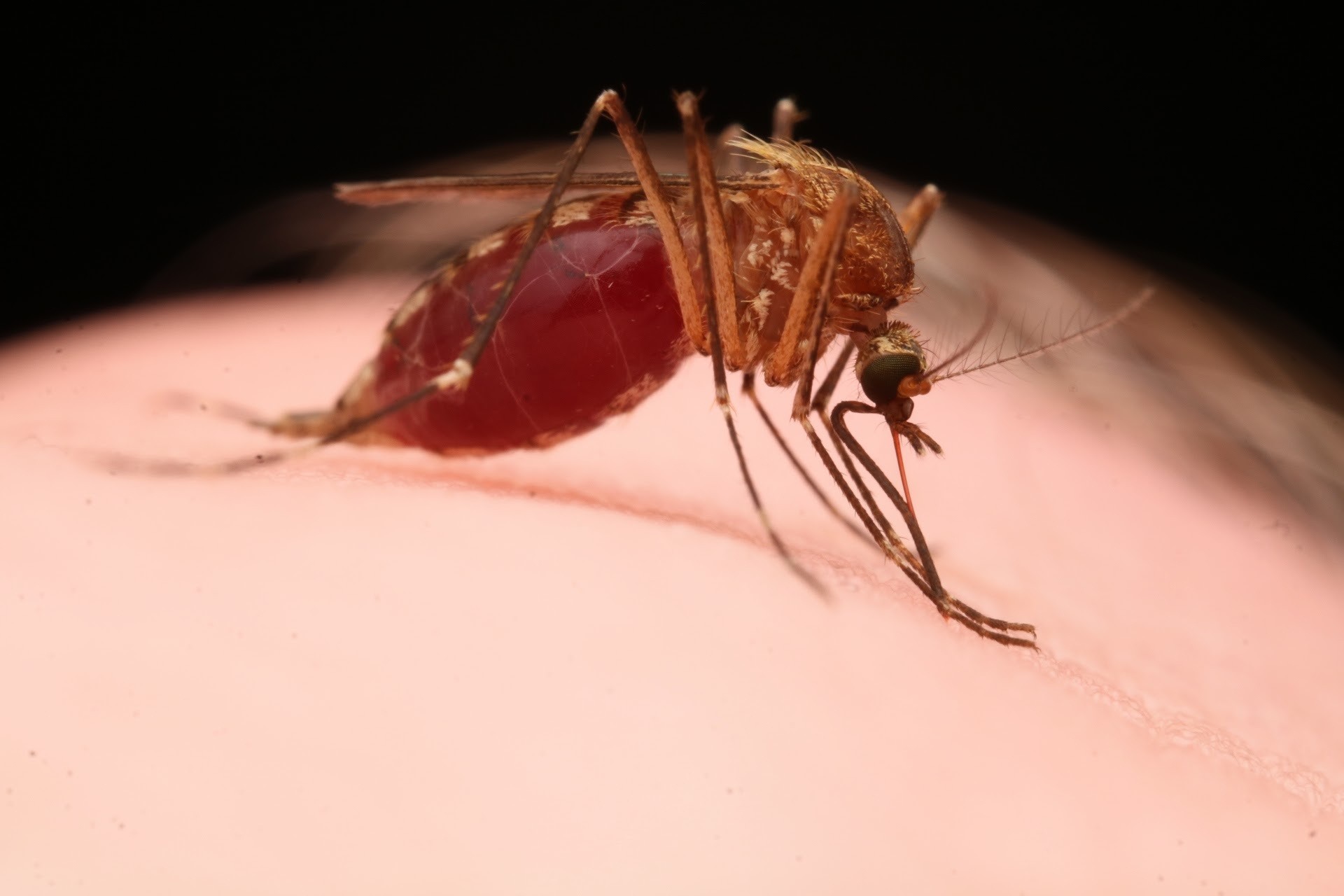
A. c. canadensis feeding on human blood

- A. canadensis mathesoni (Middlekauff, 1944) from the southern parts of the species' range

== Identification ==
Aedes canadensis often occurs with con-generic species and to be sure of identification of either adults or larvae an identification key and microscope are required. In general the adults of this species have dark, the females often reddish, bodies which have contrasting white banded tarsi with the bands at each end of the segments.

== Biology ==
Female Aedes canadensis gain blood meals from a wide range of large and small animals, birds and reptiles. It is particularly associated with turtles and clouds of this species are frequently observed surrounding turtles crossing roads to lay their eggs during May. Animals fed on by the females includes large and small mammals, birds, reptiles and amphibians, there is a record of the females feeding on a leopard frog.

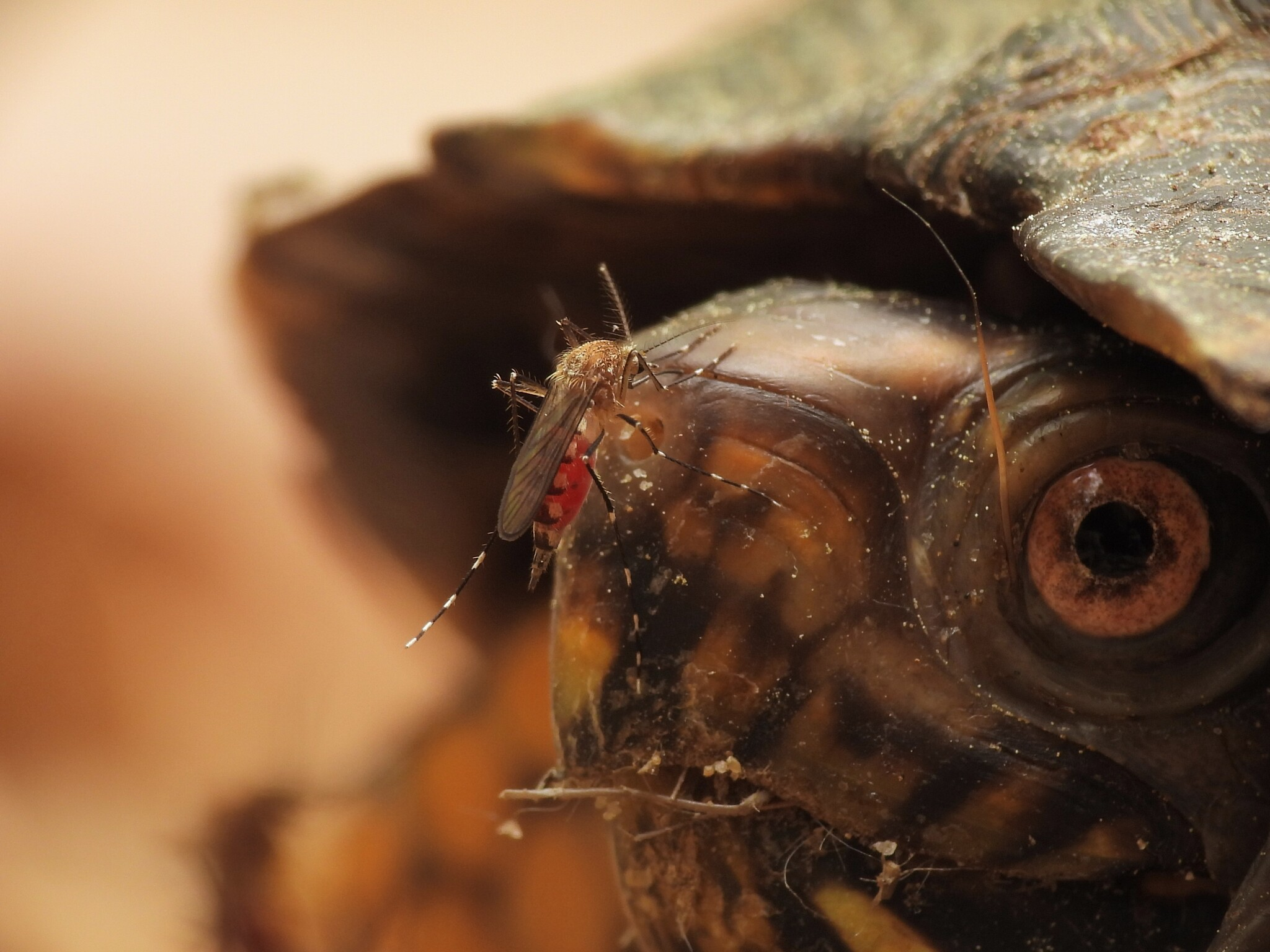
Female feeding on an eastern box turtle

The larvae of A. canadensis grow in temporary or semi permanent woodland pools which contain fallen leaves and which tend to be shaded, they are less frequently found in pools in small stream beds or in standing water next to wooded areas. They can also be found in swamps and marshes with emergent vegetation such as reeds and cattails, muskeg pools and peat bogs, and in some areas have been found in open prairie pools with little shade. They overwinter as eggs and in late winter and spring large numbers of larvae hatch. The females are seldom troublesome to humans in eastern North America, even when recently emerged females are extremely abundant, however, in the western part of its range they readily and persistently bite people, especially in areas of shade and throughout most of the day. The presence of larvae in the breeding pools after the Spring suggests that these mosquitoes are either laying non diapausing eggs or that the hatching of the eggs is staggered. The males have been recorded swarming in the early evening and have been recorded as obtaining nectar on orchids.

== Distribution ==
Aedes canadensis occurs in North American from the Yukon Territory and Washington state east to Newfoundland and south to Florida and Texas, south into Mexico.

== Medical importance ==
The viruses which cause eastern equine encephalitis, California encephalitis and West Nile fever have been detected in samples of Aedes canadensis and it has been shown to be a vector of dog heartworm (Dirofilaria immitis). It has also shown to be a secondary vector for the La Crosse virus in Ohio.
