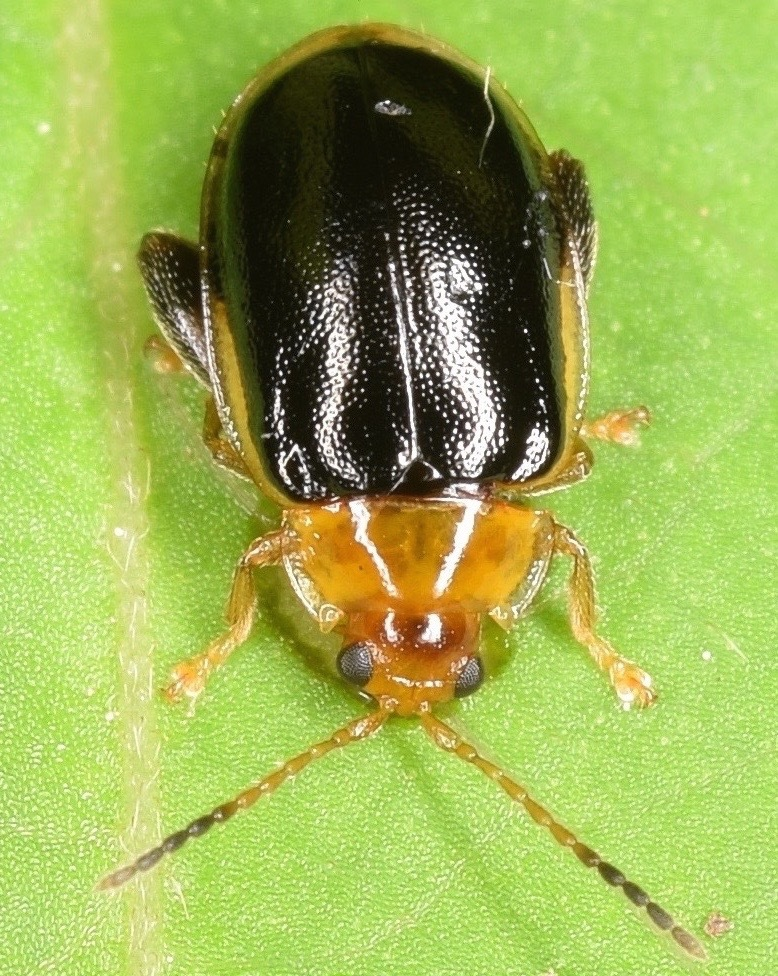

Scientific classification
- Kingdom: Animalia
- Phylum: Arthropoda
- Class: Insecta
- Order: Coleoptera
- Suborder: Polyphaga
- Infraorder: Cucujiformia
- Family: Chrysomelidae
- Tribe: Alticini
- Genus: Capraita
- Species: C. circumdata

Binomial name
- Capraita circumdata (Randall, 1838)

= Capraita circumdata =

Species of beetle

Capraita circumdata is a species of flea beetle in the family Chrysomelidae. It is endemic to North America.
