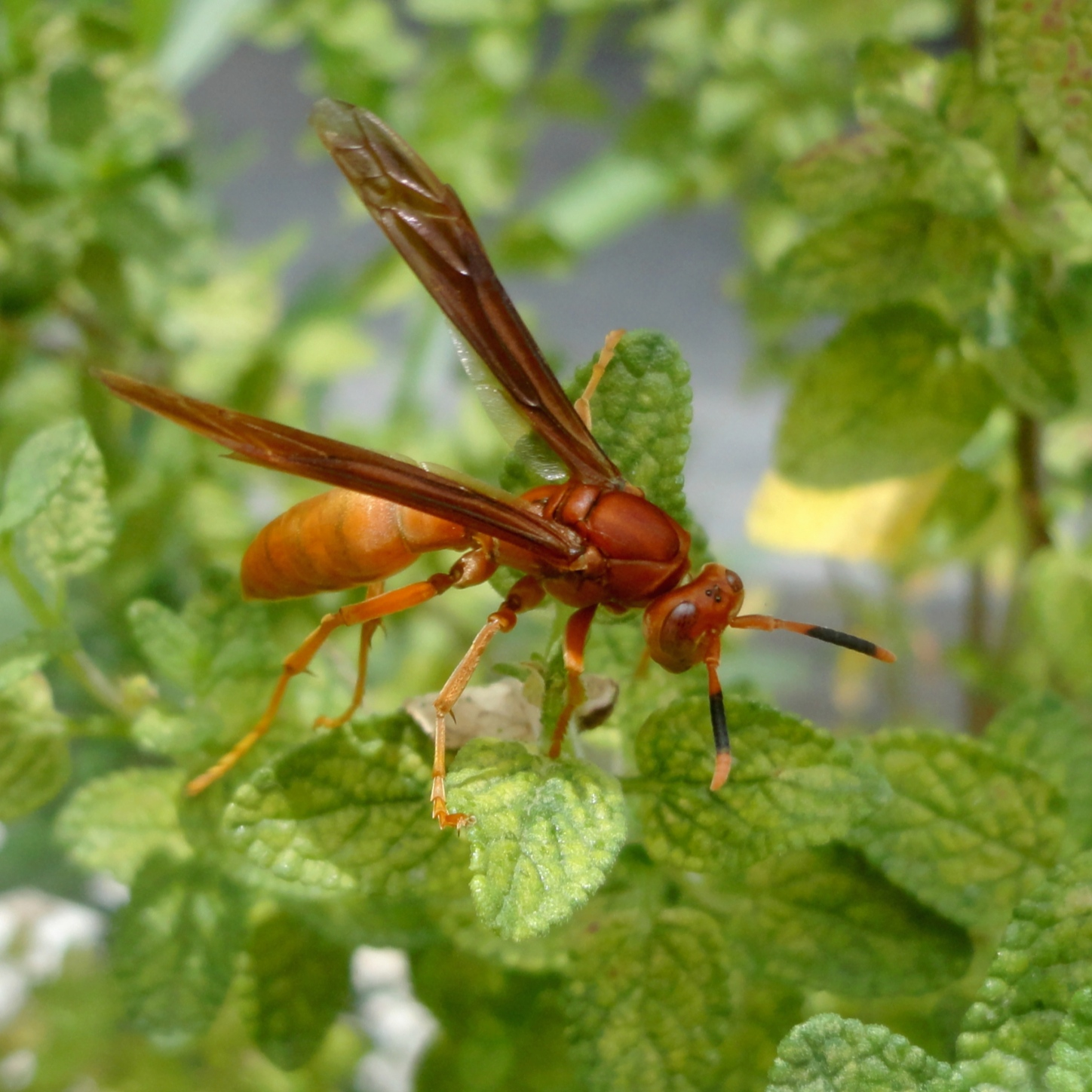

Scientific classification
- Kingdom: Animalia
- Phylum: Arthropoda
- Class: Insecta
- Order: Hymenoptera
- Family: Vespidae
- Subfamily: Polistinae
- Tribe: Polistini
- Genus: Polistes
- Species: P. canadensis

Binomial name
- Polistes canadensis (Linnaeus, 1758)

Synonyms
- Polistes panamensis Holmgren, 1868; Polistes unicolor Lepeletier, 1836; Polistes urceolata Klug Erichs., 1848; Vespa lanis Fabricius, 1775; Vespa marribous Christ, 1791

= Polistes canadensis =

Species of wasp

Polistes canadensis is a species of red paper wasp found in the Neotropical realm. It is a primitively eusocial wasp as a member of the subfamily Polistinae. A largely predatory species, it hunts for caterpillar meat to supply its colony, often supplementing its developing larvae with nectar. The most widely distributed American species of the genus Polistes, it colonizes multiple combs, which it rears year-round.

Emerging from hibernation in the spring, the females found nests built from plant material such as dry grass and dead wood. These nests are not covered with an envelope and feature hexagonal cells in which eggs are laid and larvae develop. The Polistes canadensis colony divides its colony among several combs and does not reuse these combs as a defense mechanism against parasites such as the tineid moth. On average, a single female queen with 9.1 foundresses usually initiates the construction of new combs and cells to form nests. The more foundresses in a colony, the more combs produced. On average, combs grow for 15.4 days and achieve a size of 30.8 cells. One female queen exercises absolute dominance over all other females, often using lateral abdominal vibrations and stroking to suppress the aggressive behavior of her nestmates.

While the queen handles all the nest reproduction, the subordinates work to care for, defend, and feed the nest instead. The divisions of labor within the nest correlate with the ages of Polistes canadensis. Aside from the female division of labor, male Polistes canadensis engage in two alternative mating tactics: the role of the territorial male (who chases away intruding patrollers) and the role of the patroller (who flies from tree to tree and does not chase other males). The study of the dominance relations within the Polistes canadensis has provided insight into the social organization that characterizes many social invertebrates.

== Taxonomy and phylogeny ==
The Swedish zoologist Carl Linnaeus described this species in 1758. The species epithet is a New Latin term canadensis used to refer to organisms associated with Canada. Linnaeus was misinformed about the origin of his specimen, because although it has an extensive range throughout North America, Polistes canadensis only occurs as far north as southern Arizona.

Part of the social Vespidae, Polistes (the true paper wasps) marks the transition between solitary and highly social behavior among wasps. Polistes canadensis is a member of the New World Polistes subgenus Aphanilopterus, and closely related to Polistes annularis (from the Eastern US to Texas), Polistes erythrocephalus (Nicaragua through Brazil), and Polistes infuscatus (northern South America).

== Description and identification ==
Both male and female Polistes canadensis have a uniformly light to dark mahogany-brown body, sometimes with the head and thorax of a lighter shade. Some feature a yellow apical margin of the first tergum as well. The wings are purplish black, and the veins and stigma are either black or reddish brown. Polistes canadensis is a large-bodied wasp with a wing length ranging from 17.0 to 24.5 mm.

Nests are constructed from plant fibers such as dry grass and dead wood, which, as with other paper wasps, are mixed with saliva to create water-resistant nests made out of papery material. These nests are not covered with an outer envelope and feature hexagonal cells in which eggs are laid and larvae develop. A growing Polistes canadensis colony often engages in fission into several combs, with an average size of 30.8 cells per comb. A large, mature but still growing colony may have over 800 cells distributed among over 30 combs. Combs on vertical (walls and tree trunks) and sloping surfaces (tree limbs) hang with the petiole at the upper end. Colonies on tree trunks tend to add secondary combs above or below the first comb resulting in a linear arrangement. In contrast, nests on horizontal surfaces away from edges (i.e. ceilings) feature eccentric petioles with secondary combs bordering the central primary comb in a semicircular perimeter. No comb has more than one petiole. Petioles average 9.9 mm in length. When combs reach their final size, adult wasps can often step directly from one comb to another; the average distance between petioles of nearby combs is 2.9 cm. Although rare, adjacent combs sometimes fuse if they make contact.

== Distribution and habitat ==
Polistes canadensis is widely distributed over most of the Neotropical region, ranging from Arizona to Argentina. Some locations include, but are not limited to, Mexico, Guatemala, Honduras, Colombia, Ecuador, Venezuela, British Guiana, Trinidad, Brazil, Peru, Bolivia and Paraguay. Nests can often be found on human constructions such as buildings, in open habitats on trunks and large limbs of trees, and in sheltered sites such as in caves, sheds, or under peeling bark.

== Colony cycle ==
On average, a single female queen with 9.1 foundresses usually initiates the construction of new combs and cells to form nests. The more foundresses in a colony, the more combs produced. The preemergence period of comb development lasts from initiation of the first comb until the first adult offspring emerges, when the postemergence period begins. On average, combs grow for 15.4 days and achieve a size of 30.8 cells. Although comb enlargement tends to stop when the oldest brood in that comb had pupated, in many cases, the brood is still in the egg stage, so the stage of brood development in the comb does not seem to provide the cue that causes the queen to cease comb development. The egg to adult development period takes around 40 days, during which time the first helpers emerge in the nest. Unlike other species of Polistes, no more than one generation of broods is housed in a comb. Therefore, as older combs are abandoned, brood rearing moves into new combs, with most colonies having about 38 combs. This multiple comb-building tactic is thought to be a defense mechanism against brood loss to moth infestations. Broods are reared year round and two or three generations of offspring are reared during the colony cycle of several months. Polistes canadensis is an asynchronous species, meaning that there appears to be no relationship between the time of the year and the colony’s development. Colonies are observed to be founded or abandoned at any time of the year, but the mean duration of the brood development stages differ between cold-dry and warm-rainy seasons.

== Behavior ==
=== Dominance hierarchy ===
One female queen exercises absolute dominance over all other females. The queen can only effectively control her subordinates if they are within her physical reach. She often suppresses the aggressive behavior of her nestmates through lateral abdominal vibrations and stroking. In contrast to the aggressive actions of the queen, the unmated females are unaggressive and often workers, even if they possess developed ovaries. Even the non-queen female with the most developed ovaries—the queen’s greatest potential challenger—will await the despotic queen’s demise without being aggressive. Because non-queens' interactions are rarely aggressive, if there is a queen, no other hierarchy amongst the subordinates will be seen. Only when no queen reigns does the frequency of aggressive interactions amongst the foundresses become significant; the level of aggressiveness and position within the nest often mirrors the reproductive state of the wasp. As the despotic queen ages and her dominance wanes, the colony cycle will gradually end as the nest is abandoned and the younger females of the nest, with the most developed ovaries, form new colonies.

=== Reproductive suppression ===
While queen control in other Polistes species involves more non-confrontational behavior, Polistes canadensis is characterized by confrontational dominance—the queen will face aggressors and subordinates with a physical action that can sometimes escalate into fatal battles. This aggressiveness can especially be seen in the queen’s territorial defense of the egg-laying region of the nest. In the absence of the dominant queen, most of the subordinates within the nest would be capable of laying eggs if given access to empty cells. The queen is able to inhibit the ovary development and reproduction of her subordinates through physical attacks on any subordinates who approach the empty cells and newly laid eggs that she guards. This is similar to the behavior of queens in Polistes instabilis, who suppress ovary development in workers by performing aggressive dominance interactions.

=== Mating behavior ===
Male Polistes canadensis engage in two alternative mating tactics: the role of the territorial male (who chases away intruding patrollers) and the role of the patroller (who flies from tree to tree and does not chase other males). Patrollers have a smaller body size than territorial males. Because of their inability to successfully compete against the larger territorial males for territories, these smaller males resort to patrolling. While physical altercations between territorial males and intruding patrollers are rare (<5% of the time) as the intruders typically quickly depart, there is still significant competition over the possession of territories. Owning a territory tends to lead to more copulations, although the territory itself does not hold any resources or nests. The defense of these territories represents a lek polygyny mating system that is not based on resources. But rather, females perhaps incentivize males to compete for territories by restricting mating to these territories; this way, females know that the territorial males they choose to mate with are strong, healthy males. To attract females to the territories, males can rub their abdomens across the territories to apply pheromones. The patrollers do not just wait around for territories to be vacated; they will sneak matings with females in territories when the territorial males are temporarily away or distracted.

== Kin selection ==
As they work to feed, rear, and defend the nest, helper Polistes canadensis forgo personal reproduction in order to care for the nest. These workers are closely related to their female nestmates (r = 0.47 ± 0.049; n = 28 nests, 145 wasps) and may not only obtain high indirect fitness by helping their nestmates, but also may gain direct fitness (in terms of personal reproduction) by taking over the reproductive role of the queen if the queen dies. Many female workers choose to care for their nestmates while waiting to become breeders in their original nests. But for younger female workers, the benefits of direct fitness may be greater than the benefits of indirect fitness. These younger females can choose to leave their original nests for a more uncertain future (in terms of indirect and direct payoffs) to co-found a new nest. For older females who are more limited reproductively, however, the best and perhaps only option would be engage in risky foraging tasks to take care of others within their nests, thereby maximizing their own indirect fitness.

== Costs and benefits of sociality ==
Because new nests are often founded near the parent nest by a group of sisters, wasps in neighboring nests tend to be closely related (Mantel test, r=-0.138, p<0.05). Therefore, workers are able to best maximize their indirect fitness by not just taking care of their home nest, but by helping out several related nests nearby. Within Polistes canadensis, 56% of females have drifted to nearby nests. While workers share the most genetic similarity with their home nestmates, these genetic benefits are outweighed by the high predation risk associated with only investing in one nest. An egg in a nest has a 40% chance of being eaten by a predator before reaching adulthood. Therefore, drifting to invest in nearby nests increases the chances that at least some of the workers’ investments survive in the face of whole-nest predation. In addition, the presence of nestmates in high nest density can also reduce predation risk—with large number of nestmates, while some workers forage, significant numbers of nestmates can remain to defend the nest.

== Defense ==
Appropriate visual stimuli, such as the movements of nearby large or dark-colored objects, can elicit attacks by Polistes canadensis, which will fly at the object in alarm, attempting to sting it. An alarmed Polistes canadensis can release venom onto its nest; the odor of venom will prompt alarm responses in its nestmates, lower their thresholds for attack, and even attract more nestmates to the alarm. Through this chemical means of communicating alarm, the colony is able to rise quickly with its sting chambers open to defend its nest against predators. Because Polistes canadensis uniquely occupy multiple combs unattached to each other, the chemical alarm substance may have arisen as a necessary adaptation for a more efficient alarm for a sparsely dispersed nest. It is not known whether Polistes canadensis can release venom at the nest independent of stinging behavior in order to communicate alarm to nestmates. While these wasps have been seen to open the sting chamber independently of venom release on the nest, the solo release of venom has not been observed. The Polistes canadensis may open its sting chambers as part of a defensive display (involves bending of the gaster toward the source of alarm) or in preparation for stinging.

== Parasites ==
Present in a majority of colonies, the tineid moth (belongs to an undescribed genus) is the most common pest of Polistes canadensis. The moth lays its eggs and then these eggs hatch into larvae that can burrow from cell to cell and prey on meconia and wasp pupae. While only 0.47% of the brood is lost to predation, the wasps perform many defense mechanisms to protect their nests from these infestations. Adult wasps attempt to remove and kill moth eggs and larvae by chewing down the edges of cells, coating the cells with an oral secretion that gives the nest a dark brownish appearance. The colonies then do not reuse these infested combs to raise another brood. The wasps also clip disused combs, reducing the rate of reinfestation by moths. In some instances, though, the comb clipping is also used to provide room for the construction of new combs. One of the key reasons the Polistes canadensis nests across multiple combs rather than building a single comb like much of the rest of its genus is as a defense mechanism against the infestation of these moths. The average amount of nesting material required to build a new cell in a comb decreases as the number of cells in the comb increases. Therefore, many inefficiencies are associated with constructing several smaller combs rather than single larger combs like much of the rest of the Polistes. For example, the need to build a separate petiole for each comb comes with the construction of multiple combs. By building multiple combs and failing to reutilize them, the costs Polistes canadensis pay to defend its nests are significant and quite large in terms of energy expended in nest construction per brood reared. Other common parasites include three species of the obligate hymenopterous parasitoid: Seminota, Toechorychus albimaculatus and the Pachysomides iheringi. 4.4% of Polistes canadensis pupae are lost to these Hymenoptera.
