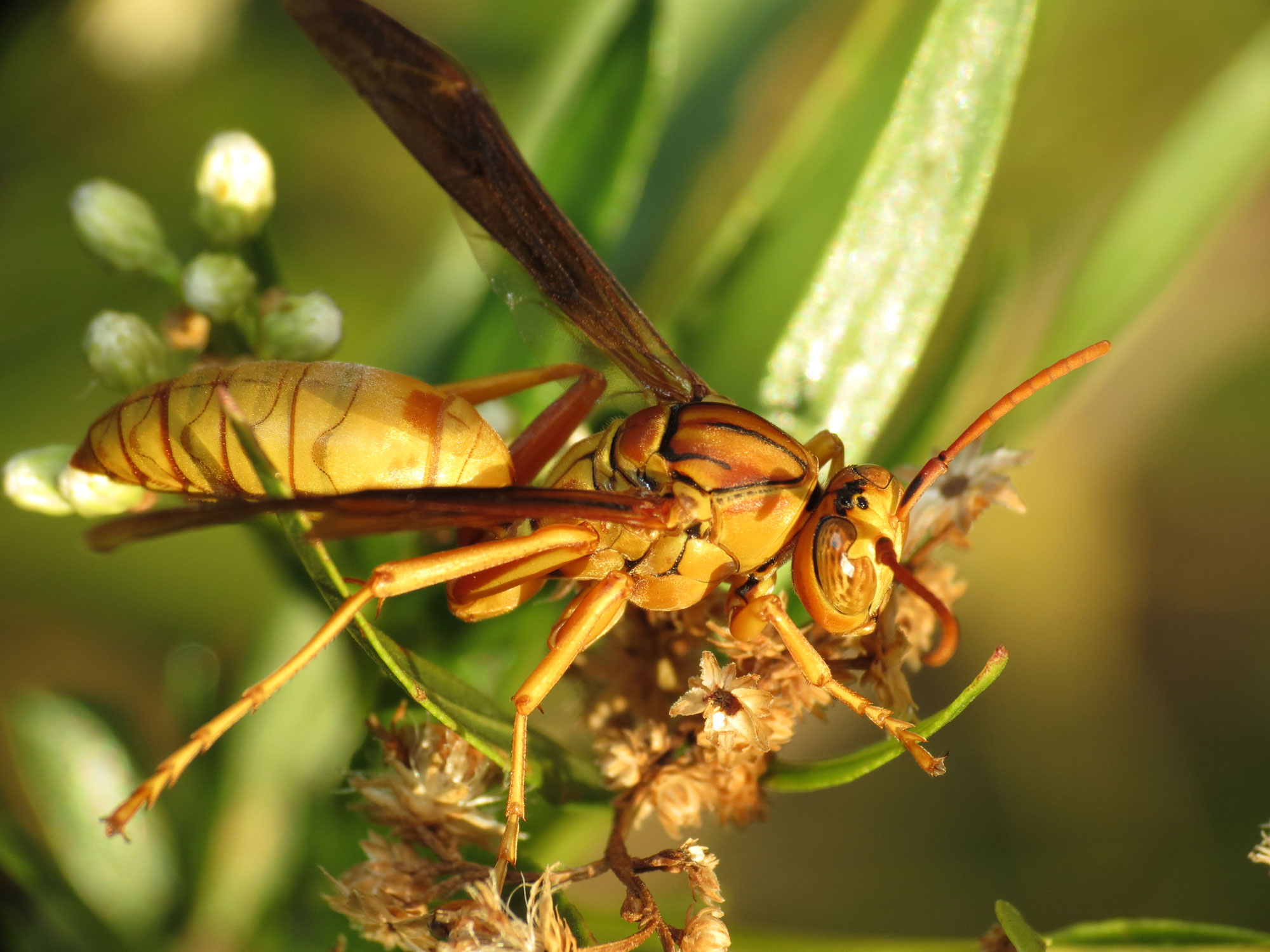

Scientific classification
- Domain: Eukaryota
- Kingdom: Animalia
- Phylum: Arthropoda
- Class: Insecta
- Order: Hymenoptera
- Family: Vespidae
- Subfamily: Polistinae
- Genus: Polistes
- Species: P. flavus

Binomial name
- Polistes flavus Cresson, 1868

= Polistes flavus =

Species of wasp

Polistes flavus, also known as the yellow paper wasp, is a species of paper wasp in the family Vespidae.
