= Christ (surname) =

Christ or von Christ is a relatively common surname in Germany, especially in Bavaria. Occasionally, the name has been incorporated into pseudonyms.

Those bearing it include:

- Benjamin C. Christ (1824–1869), American Civil War colonel
- Brad Christ, American politician
- Carol P. Christ (born 1945), American academic, feminist and eco-feminist theologian
- Carol T. Christ (born 1944), American academic and administrator
- Charles "Chilla" Christ (1911–1998), Australian cricketer
- Christin Christ (born 1989), German politician
- Dorothy Christ (1925–2020), All-American Girls Professional Baseball League player
- Elizabeth Christ Trump (1880–1966), German-born American businesswoman, grandmother of U.S. President Donald Trump
- Grégory Christ (born 1982), French football player
- Hermann Christ (1833–1933), Swiss botanist
- Johann Ludwig Christ (1739–1813), German naturalist, gardener and pastor
- John Christ (born 1965), American musician
- Karl Christ (1897 – after 1944), German First World War flying ace
- Lena Christ (1881–1920), German writer
- Ludwig Christ (1791–1876), Swiss journalist and writer
- Margaret H. Christ (born 1978), American accounting professor
- F. Michael Christ (born 1955), American mathematician
- Nicolaus Christ von Santz (1732–1799), Grisons officer and politician
- Norman Christ (born c. 1945), American academic
- Sonja Christ (born 1984), 61st German Wine Queen
- Stephan Christ (born 1991), German politician
- Sven Christ (born 1973), Swiss footballer
- Victor Christ-Janer (1915–2008), American architect
- Wilhelm von Christ (1831–1906), German classical scholar

== See also ==
- Christ family (Grisons), a family from the Grisons
- Jesus, the central figure of Christianity, believed by Christians to be the Christ
- Christ (title), the Greek title for Messiah, the savior and liberator of the Jewish people and mankind
- Crist (surname)
- Christos (surname)
- Christo (name)
- Krist
