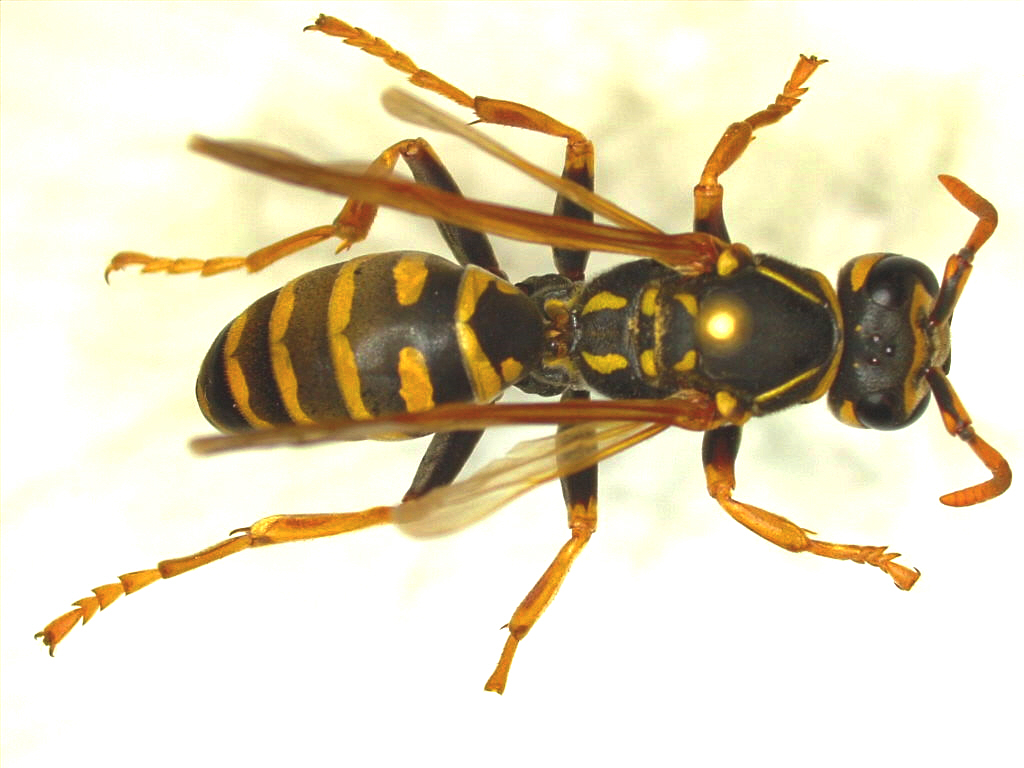

Scientific classification
- Kingdom: Animalia
- Phylum: Arthropoda
- Clade: Pancrustacea
- Class: Insecta
- Order: Hymenoptera
- Family: Vespidae
- Subfamily: Polistinae
- Tribe: Polistini
- Genus: Polistes
- Species: P. austroccidentalis

Binomial name
- Polistes austroccidentalis Van Achterberg & Neumeyer, 2017

= Polistes austroccidentalis =

Species of wasp

Polistes austroccidentalis is a kleptoparasitic paper wasp that is found in several regions of high altitude in Europe, and until 2017 was universally mistakenly referred to as Polistes semenowi, which is instead the correct name of the species formerly known as "Polistes sulcifer". As one of only four obligate parasites in the subgenus Polistes, it uses the nests of other paper wasps (primarily Polistes dominula) to rear its young. To evade detection by the host nest, P. austroccidentalis employs mimicry by adjusting its cuticular hydrocarbons to match those of the host. Once the host nest has been infiltrated, the parasitic female physically attacks the host queen to subdue her and become the colony's new queen. P. austroccidentalis displays several morphological adaptations for parasitism such as increased mandible size and an enlarged Van der Vecht's organ. This species is unusual because it does not have the ability to produce workers and is only able to produce individuals who have the capacity to reproduce.

== Taxonomy and phylogeny ==
Due to its morphological differences from other Polistes species, Polistes austroccidentalis was placed in a separate genus Sulcopolistes by Blüthgen in 1938. However, in 1991 Carpenter established that this species belonged in the subgenus Polistes. P. austroccidentalis is closely related to Polistes atrimandibularis, Polistes maroccanus, and Polistes semenowi. Research using mitochondrial rRNA suggests that these species descended from a common ancestor, and that they are more closely related with Polistes nimpha and Polistes dominula than with Polistes gallicus and Polistes biglumis. In 2017, careful taxonomic research revealed that for over 100 years, the species originally named Polistes semenowi in 1889 had been misclassified, and been recognized instead under the name Polistes sulcifer, while the species that had been called Polistes semenowi had never been given a name, so it was named Polistes austroccidentalis.

== Description and identification ==
P. austroccidentalis is larger than most Polistes species, which initially caused it to be classified in a separate genus (Sulcopolistes). Both the first femur and posterior tibia of this wasp are elongated, and its mandibles are significantly thicker than those of other wasp species. Moreover, the mandibles of this species, similarly to related parasitic species, are marked by a distinct groove. This wasp species also has distinctive black markings on its clypeus, the function of which are currently unclear.

== Distribution and habitat ==
The overall distribution of this species is southwestern and southern central Europe, and northern Africa. P. austroccidentalis populations typically exist near regions of high altitude around the Mediterranean basin. However, on occasion, they may also be found around the Caspian basins. The distribution of P. austroccidentalis is patchy as a result of its altitudinal migration patterns. During the winter, the wasps ascend to a higher altitude; in the spring, however, they descend to the lowlands to find host colonies.

== Colony cycle ==
These wasps migrate to high altitudes to mate and then proceed to overwinter in the same mountainous areas. In the spring, females move down the elevation gradient parasitize P. dominula, a lowland species. Once a P. austroccidentalis female discovers a host nest, it attempts to usurp it. The timing of this usurpation is intimately linked to the emergence of P. dominula workers. If no workers have emerged, the hosts may simply abandon the colony. If most of the workers have already emerged, they may be able to fend off a P. austroccidentalis invasion. Having usurped the dominant female host, the P. austroccidentalis female proceeds to lay her eggs. After a period of several weeks, the parasitic female will abandon the nest. Once her offspring emerge from the host nest, they migrate to high altitudes, continuing the cycle.

== Parasitism ==
P. austroccidentalis are one of only four species of Polistes that are obligate social parasites. This means these wasps take advantage of the social systems of other species. As a social parasite, P. austroccidentalis usurps a host colony in order to take advantage of the entire host colonial cycle. Specifically, this parasitic wasp exploits P. dominula, a lowland wasp species. Although P. austroccidentalis is a specialized parasite of P. dominula, it is also able to parasitize colonies of P. nimpha. Since P. austroccidentalis is unable to create nests and produce worker classes, it is completely dependent on a host colony to fulfill these functions.

Because P. austroccidentalis normally attacks the host's nests just prior to worker emergence, it is surmised that such selection pressure might have impacted the developmental times in P. dominula to be shorter. It would be advantageous for the hosts to make their brood developmental time to be shorter so that they can rapidly generate workers and defend their nests.

=== Evolutionary basis of parasitism ===
Like other hymenopterans, Polistes species undergo a complete metamorphosis during development in which the young are completely dependent on workers for all of their food and protection needs. A large energetic investment is necessary for the young to successfully pupate and grow to reproductive age. The amount of resources invested in the young determines which caste they belong to: less food causes the larvae to develop into workers, while more food causes the larvae to develop into reproductives. By manipulating another species into investing a large amount of energetic resources into their own young, P. austroccidentalis would be able to take advantage of host workers and would no longer have a need to produce its own workers. Instead, more resources could be devoted to larvae, causing all of them to develop into reproductives. Over time, P. austroccidentalis has completely lost the ability to create its own worker class and has adopted a strategy of parasitism. The parasitic larvae display rapid growth, which allows P. austroccidentalis to optimize its rate of offspring production.

=== Establishing dominance over host queen ===
Approximately two months after a P. dominula female has founded a colony, the female parasite attempts to usurp the nest. Approaching the dominant host female, the parasite aggressively attacks her in an attempt to drive her out of the nest. Behaviors include chasing the queen out of the nest as well as physically confronting her. These behaviors have been demonstrated in the laboratory: in controlled experiments, female parasites introduced to host nests immediately entered the nest and identified the most dominant female, proceeding to aggressively approach her. After initially physically establishing dominance over the queen, the parasitic female coexists with subordinate females and may, in some cases, allow the former dominant female to stay in the nest.

=== Reproduction within host colony ===
Once she has entered the colony and subdued the dominant host female, the parasite immediately begins laying eggs. Some time after the initial invasion – approximately thirty days – the hosts chemically recognize the parasites as their own species. Additionally, the parasite attempts to destroy the larvae and eggs of the host queen to ensure that the host colony invests all of its resources into her young. After this initial destruction, however, the P. austroccidentalis female does not attack any emerging host workers, and spends most of her time laying eggs. Unable to differentiate between the parasite and their own species, host workers feed and care for the parasite young as the parasite queen continues to lay eggs.

=== Morphological adaptations for parasitism ===
For their parasitic strategy to succeed, P. austroccidentalis must be able to enter and successfully usurp a host nest. However, host colonies are able to mount a defense by mobilizing any emerging workers as well as dominant females. Therefore, P. austroccidentalis must be morphologically adapted to overcome such defensive attacks. The parasitic wasp is significantly larger than its host; in fact, P. austroccidentalis is so much larger than P. dominula that it was initially thought to be in a separate genus. The first femur and posterior tibia of this wasp is enlarged, providing an advantage during attacks. P. austroccidentalis also has thicker and larger mandibles, which are used during attacks to drive off dominant host females. However, since this species does not use its sting during a host colony invasion, its sting is not morphologically distinct from other Polistes species.

== Mimicry ==
Host colonies only mount a defense against parasites if they recognize it as distinct from their own species. Though the parasitic wasp can overcome the physical defenses of a host nest, it must also be able to camouflage itself after usurpation. This aids the wasp from having to continually battle for dominance. For P. austroccidentalis, this is achieved by mimicking the chemical signals of the host colony so that the parasite is recognized as a member of the host species. By successfully mimicking the hydrocarbon patterns of host wasps, P. austroccidentalis wasps are accepted by the colony and can ensure that host workers will raise the parasitic offspring.

=== Hydrocarbon signals ===
Like other social insects, wasps recognize each other through chemical signals. Each colony has a specific blend of hydrocarbons that is secreted onto the cuticle of the wasps. This hydrocarbon signature allows individuals to distinguish nest mates from interlopers. An unfamiliar hydrocarbon signature signals that the colony should mount a defense against a potential intruder. As soon as a female P. austroccidentalis wasp enters a host nest, she begins to vigorously rub her abdomen against the comb. This allows the parasitic female to coat herself with the host hydrocarbon pattern, which she immediately begins to mimic. Although its initial hydrocarbon signature is relatively close to that of its host P. dominula, after usurpation, P. austroccidentalis is able to exactly match the hydrocarbons of its host colony.

=== Van der Vecht's organ ===
The hydrocarbons secreted by Polistes wasps are efficiently spread on to the cuticle by a structure called the Van der Vecht's organ. This structure is located on the last gastral sternite of the wasp, on the anterior edge. It is composed of a hairy, transparent cuticle. When compared to females of their host species P. dominula, female P. austroccidentalis wasps have a significantly enlarged Van der Vecht's organ. Since the Van der Vecht's organ spreads hydrocarbons that enable P. austroccidentalis mimicry, increased size of the structure in this species most likely occurred as a result of selective pressure on the wasp due to the success of its parasitic life strategy.
