= Cuckoo paper wasp =

Group of wasps

The name cuckoo paper wasp refers to a monophyletic species group of brood-parasitic paper wasps in the genus Polistes. This species group contains only four species; Polistes atrimandibularis, P. austroccidentalis, P. maroccanus, and P. semenowi, all of them obligate social parasites of other Polistes species.

These species, three of which occur in Europe, were originally classified as the subgenus Sulcopolistes by Blüthgen in 1938, but such a group would render the subgenus Polistes paraphyletic, and is therefore no longer formally recognized. Research using mitochondrial rRNA supports the view that these species descended from a common ancestor, and suggests that they are more closely related to Polistes nimpha and Polistes dominula (the latter being host to at least three of the four species) than to Polistes gallicus or Polistes biglumis, thus constituting an example of Emery's rule.
