= Van der Vecht's gland =

Gland on the sternite of female wasps

Van der Vecht's gland or Van der Vecht's organ is a gland which is located in an area of modified cuticle on the rearmost gastral sternite of female wasps. This gland secretes chemicals which are important in the determination and maintenance of the hierarchy of groups of eusocial wasps and are used in the defence of the nests in others. In the Asian giant hornet (Vespa mandarinia) the Van der Vecht's gland is used to scent mark hives of honey bees to attract other members of their colony to cooperatively attack the hive; the only known case of the gland's use to scent mark a food source. In the cleptoparasitic paper wasp Polistes semenowi the female usurps the host foundress, usually Polistes dominula and uses an enlarged Van der Vecht's gland to produce large quantities of hydrocarbons and to control the host workers, and even sometimes the host foundress. The gland was discovered by, and named in honour of, the Dutch entomologist Jacobus van der Vecht.

At least in the wasps of the genus Polistes the dominant females, or queens, have relatively larger Van der Vecht's organs compared to the workers although the brush like structure, the sternal brush, the wasps used to brush the chemicals produced by the gland was not larger relative to the size of the wasp. It is thought that Van der Vecht's gland was to provide a chemical defence against ant predators in the species which have independent foundresses and nests without any form of protective envelope, the gland producing chemicals which repel ants and which are placed on the petiole connecting the nest to the surface it is suspended from. In swarming species the nest is always attended and scouting ants are dealt with by the attendant workers while protective envelopes may also protect against insect predator. The gland is not present in wasps belonging to the subfamily Stenogastrinae but is present in the subfamilies Polistinae and Vespinae. It has, however, been lost in some lineages within these subfamilies where they have nests founded by swarms and/or protected by an envelope. It has also been retained in lineages which have swarm foundresses and nests protected by an envelope such as the eusocial Vespinae. It is not known if the secretions of the gland in these wasps still has a defensive function, but at least in the Asian giant hornet the secretions have been repurposed.
