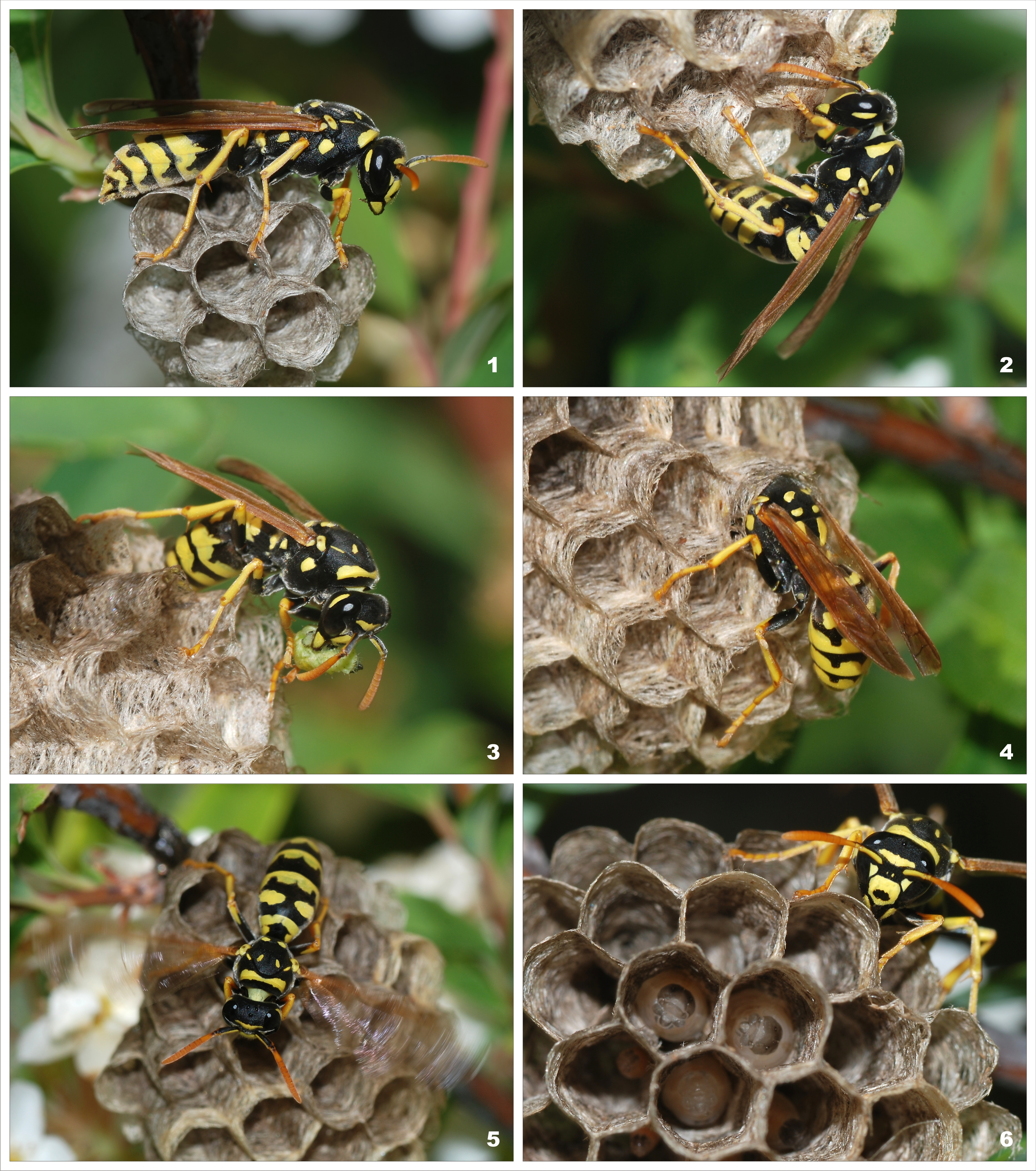
- A young paper wasp queen (Polistes gallicus) starting a new colony

Scientific classification
- Kingdom: Animalia
- Phylum: Arthropoda
- Clade: Pancrustacea
- Class: Insecta
- Order: Hymenoptera
- Superfamily: Vespoidea
- Family: Vespidae

Subfamilies with paper wasp species
- Polistinae; Stenogastrinae; Vespinae

= Paper wasp =

Vespid wasps that gather fibers from dead wood and plant stems

Paper wasp (Polistes major) nest (Polistinae); exposed comb

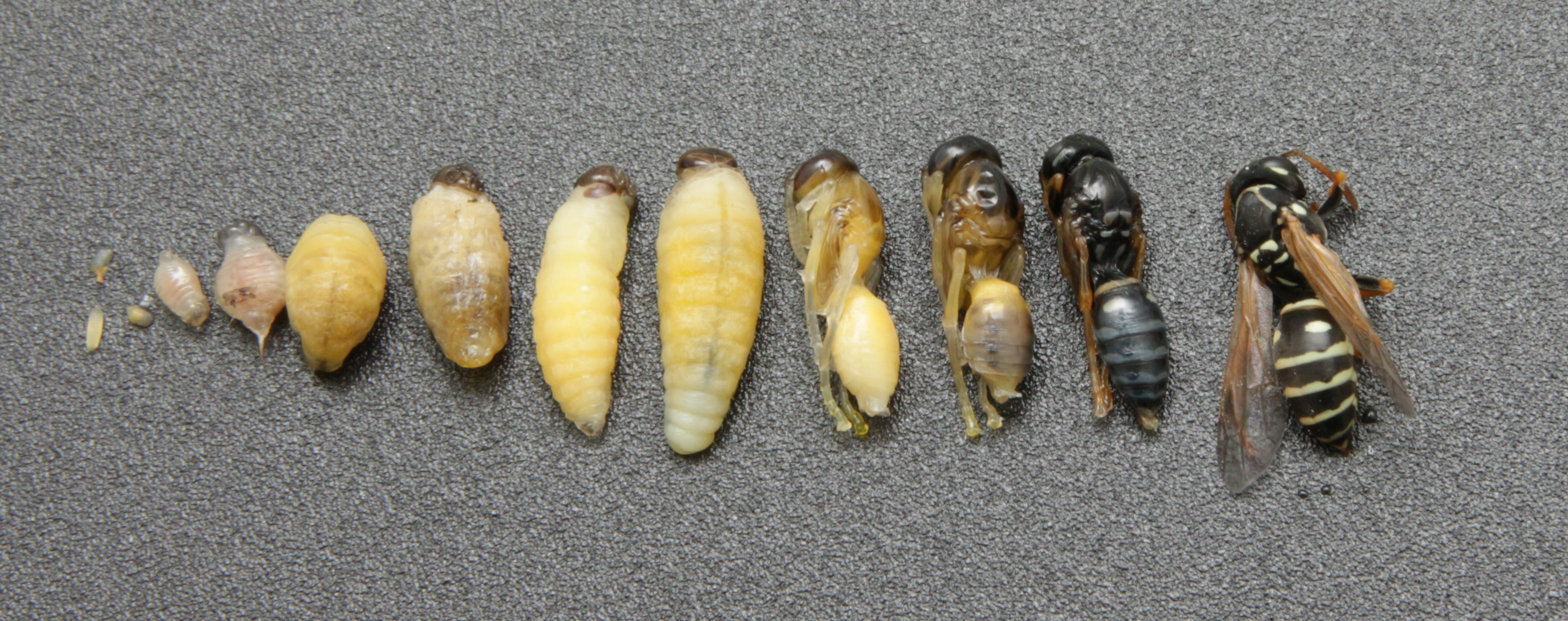
Paper wasp growth stages

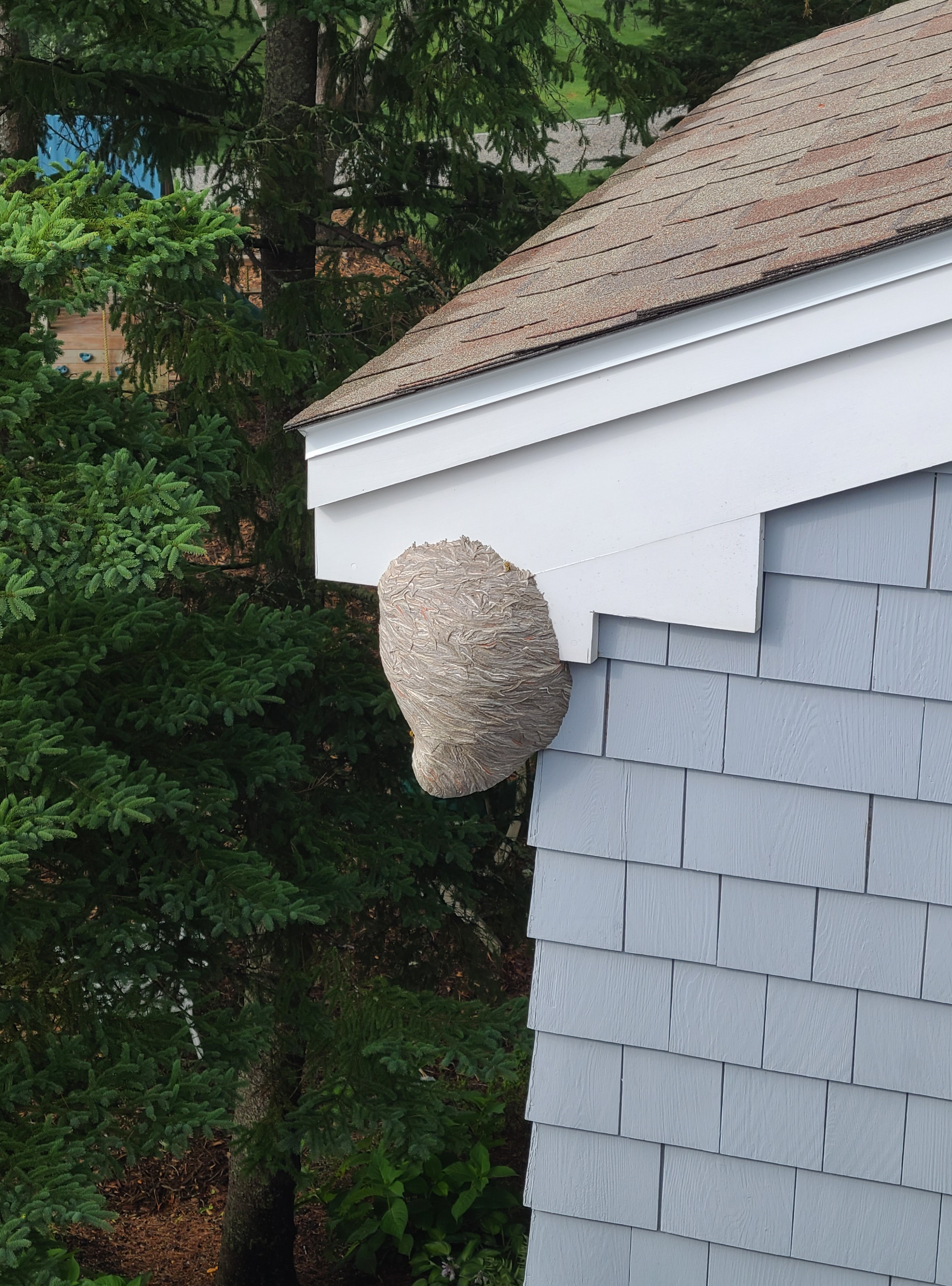
Yellowjacket nest (Vespinae); concealed comb

Paper wasps are a type of social vespid wasps. The term is typically used to refer to members of the vespid subfamily Polistinae, though it often colloquially includes members of the subfamilies Vespinae (hornets and yellowjackets) and Stenogastrinae, which also make nests out of paper.

Paper wasp nests are characterized by open combs with down pointing cells. Some types of paper wasps are occasionally referred to as umbrella wasps due to the distinctive design of their nests.

== Species ==
Approximately 300 species of Polistes paper wasps have been identified worldwide. The most common paper wasp in Europe is Polistes dominula. The Old World tribe Ropalidiini contains another 300 species, and the Neotropical tribes Epiponini and Mischocyttarini each contain over 250 more, so the total number of true paper wasps worldwide is about 1100 species, almost half of which can be found in the neotropics.

== Nests ==
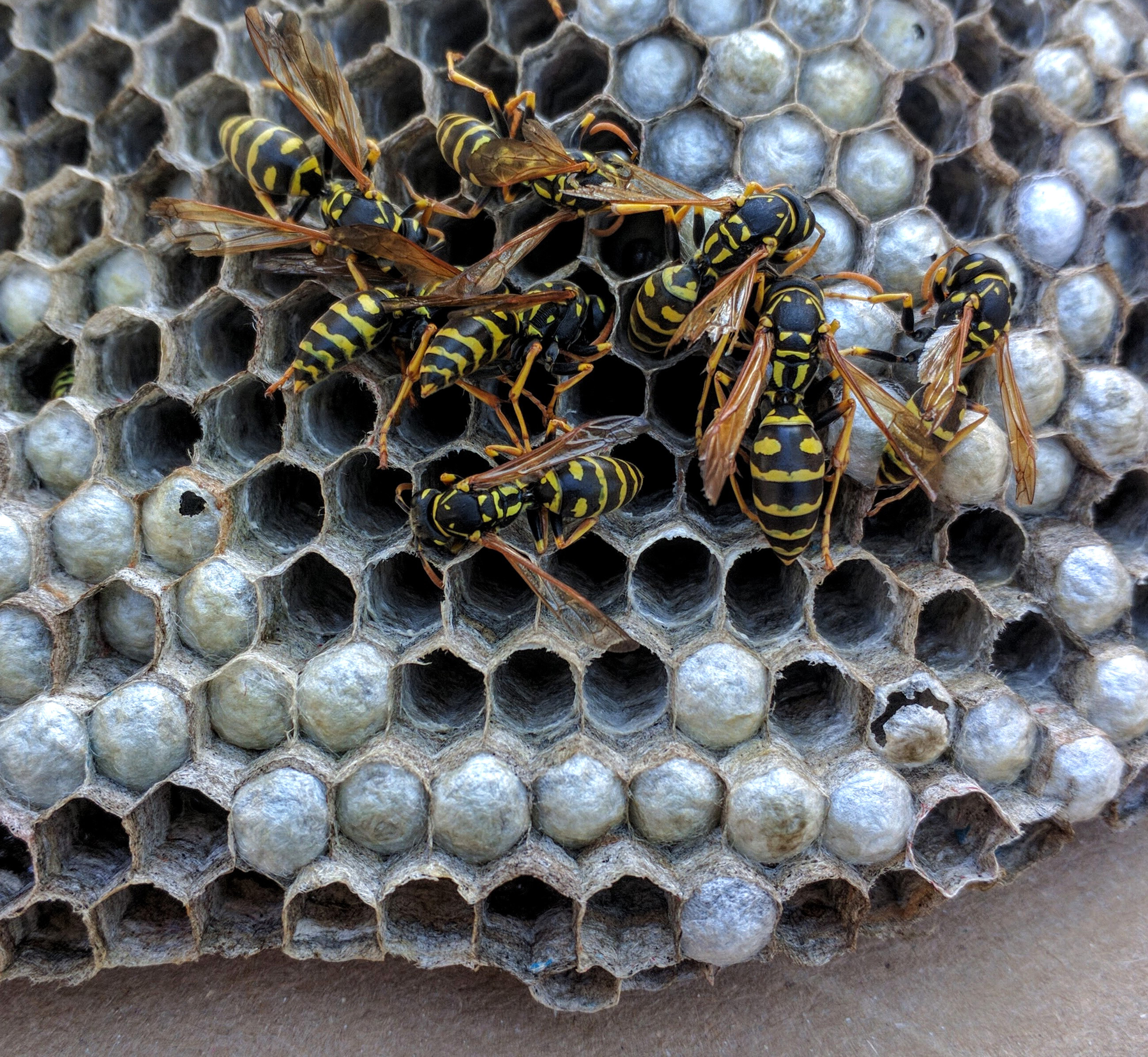
Polistes dominula on part of a large nest, in California

The nests of most true paper wasps are characterized by having open combs with cells for brood rearing. The wasps gather fibers from dead wood and plant stems, which they mix with saliva, and use to construct nests that appear made out of gray or brown papery material that is very similar to handmade paper. A 'petiole', or constricted stalk attaches the nest to a branch or other structure. The wasps secrete an ant repellent chemical which they spread around the base of the petiole or anchor to prevent the loss of eggs or brood.

Worker adding additional material to expand nest

Most social wasps of the family Vespidae make nests from paper, but some stenogastrine species, such as Liostenogaster flavolineata, use mud. A small group of eusocial crabronid wasps, of the genus Microstigmus (the only eusocial wasps outside the family Vespidae), also constructs nests out of chewed plant fibers, though the nest consistency is quite different from those of true paper wasps, due to the absence of wood fibers, and the use of silk extruded by female wasps to bind the fibers.

Nests can be found in sheltered areas, such as the eaves of a house, the branches of a tree, on the end of an open pipe, or on an old clothesline. Some species, such as Ropalidia romandi, will vary their nest architecture depending on where they build their nest.

Three species of Polistes are obligate social parasites, and have lost the ability to build their own nests, and are sometimes referred to as "cuckoo paper wasps". They rely on the nests of their hosts to raise their brood. A few hornets and yellowjackets are also brood parasites (e.g., Vespula austriaca).

== Brood rearing ==
In temperate climates, in the autumn, reproductive males and females are reared. Males find a good place to wait and attract females with pheromones while the queens fly around until they select a mate. Only the new queens hibernate overwinter in a sheltered location; the males and un-mated females die before spring. In the spring each searches for a suitable location and starts and maintains a new nest typically by herself until the first brood of female workers matures and helps in all activities except egg laying.

End of season: Male wasps mature and leave, nest shuts down leaving nest empty.

Single paper wasp foundress establishes her nest, adding cells, renewing repellent on the pedicel. She has already laid eggs in several of the incomplete cells and continually checks the nest and cells.

Queen replacing an egg that was either not viable or laid by a worker

Once eggs hatch, the legless larvae remain in their cells to be taken care of. The wasps hunt prey, primarily caterpillars, but also other insects like flies, and beetle larvae. The adult cuts up the prey and masticates it (thoroughly chewing it) prior to feeding it to the larvae.

Masticated caterpillar portion brought to nest and fed to the larvae

Water is also provided for the larva. Wasps may find a puddle or stream or dew that has collected at the base of some leaves.

Water is brought to the nest for the larvae

When the larvae mature, they pupate in their cell and the workers cap the cell, sealing them in until the adult breaks out of its pupal shell. The open nest is light colored reflecting light and the nest material provides some insulation, even so it can be subjected to elevated temperatures with sun exposure or high ambient temperatures. The wasps can cool their nest by fanning their wings and/or bringing water to place in the nest letting evaporation provide substantial cooling.

Wasps fanning the nest with their wings to provide breeze/cooling

Wasps bring water to place in nest to provide cooling by evaporation

== Behavior ==
Unlike yellowjackets and hornets, which can be very aggressive, polistine paper wasps will generally only attack if they themselves or their nest are threatened. Their territoriality can lead to attacks on people, and their stings are quite painful and – like all venomous animals – can produce a potentially fatal anaphylactic reaction in some individuals. A study conducted on European paper wasps (Polistes dominula) concluded that wasps with brighter aposematic colors are more venomous, because they have larger venom glands, and offer a stronger warning signal to organisms threatening the nest.

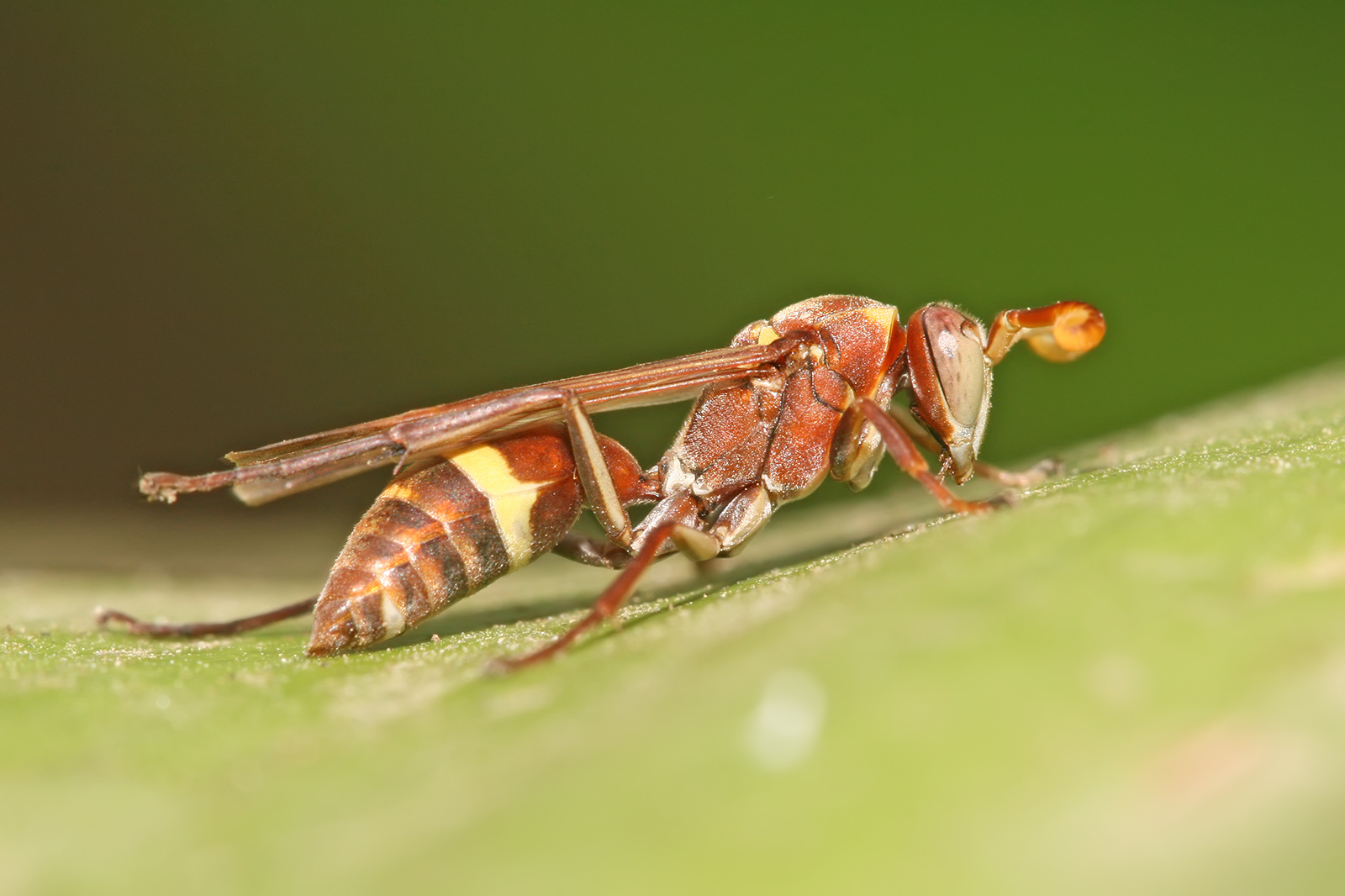
Paper wasp on a spider lily leaf – they are considered beneficial by gardeners.

A European paper wasp preying on Milkweed aphids which are on narrow leaf milkweed. Most scenes are repeated at one-fourth speed.

Paper wasps disturbed by hits to their nest support.

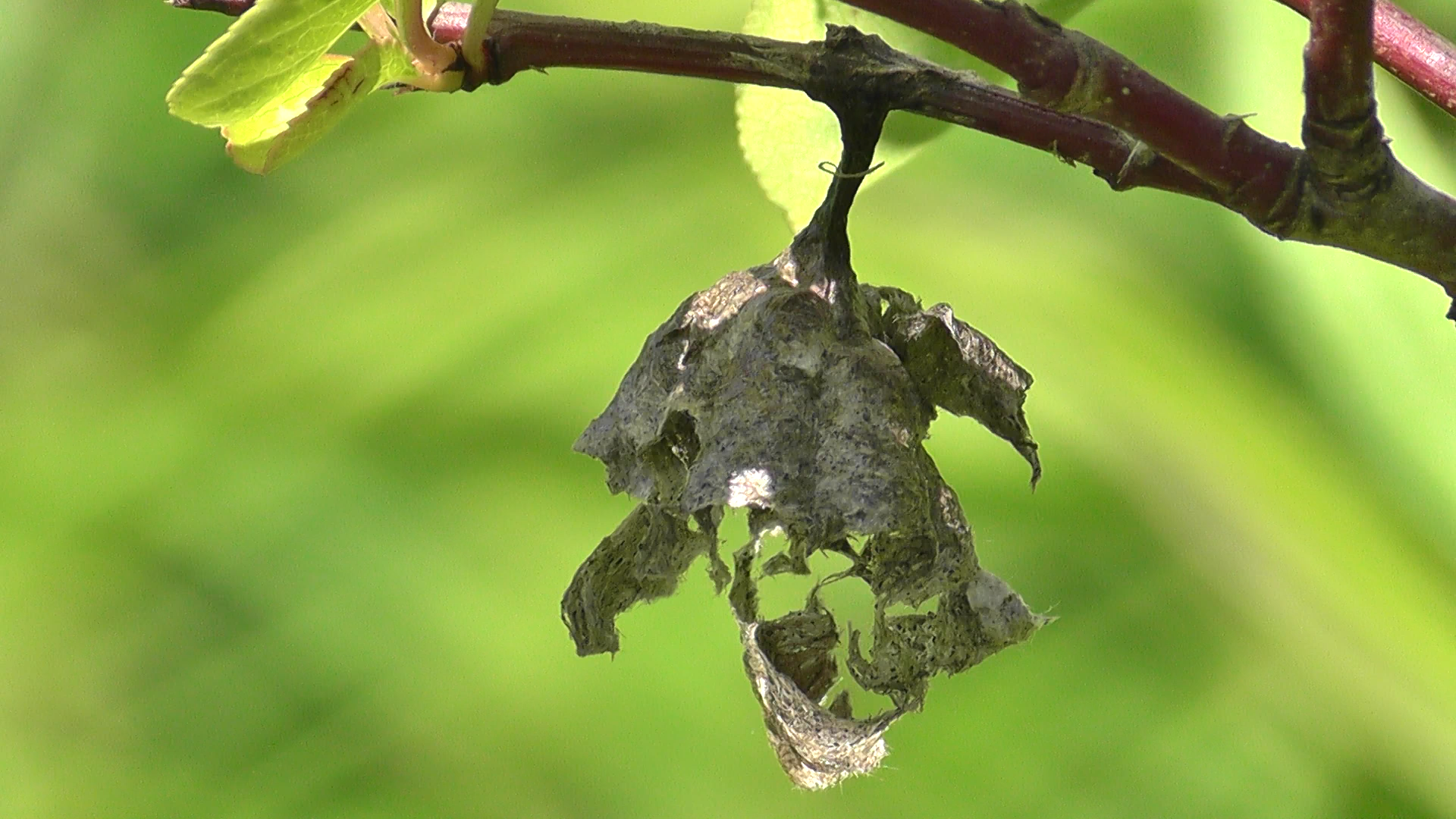
Foundress' nest raided by a rat, beetle or other predator. Nest was previously seen eleven days earlier when there were five eggs. If the foundress survived, she would start a new nest at a different location

Most wasps are beneficial in their natural habitat and are critically important in natural biocontrol. Paper wasps feed on sugars like nectar, aphid honeydew and the sugary liquid produced by their larvae. Because they are a known pollinator and feed on known garden pests, paper wasps are often considered to be beneficial by gardeners.

When threatened, the wasps have a variety of responses depending upon the severity. Paper wasps use alarm pheromones to coordinate their response. The first level is posturing. They face the perceived threat, stand tall and raise their wings.

At a higher level of threat, the wasp will move around the nest surface. With sufficient disturbance, the wasp will fly around the nest attempting to locate the source, chasing and stinging the threat.

== See also ==
- Biological pest control
- Schmidt sting pain index
- Polistes
- Polistinae
- Ropalidiini
