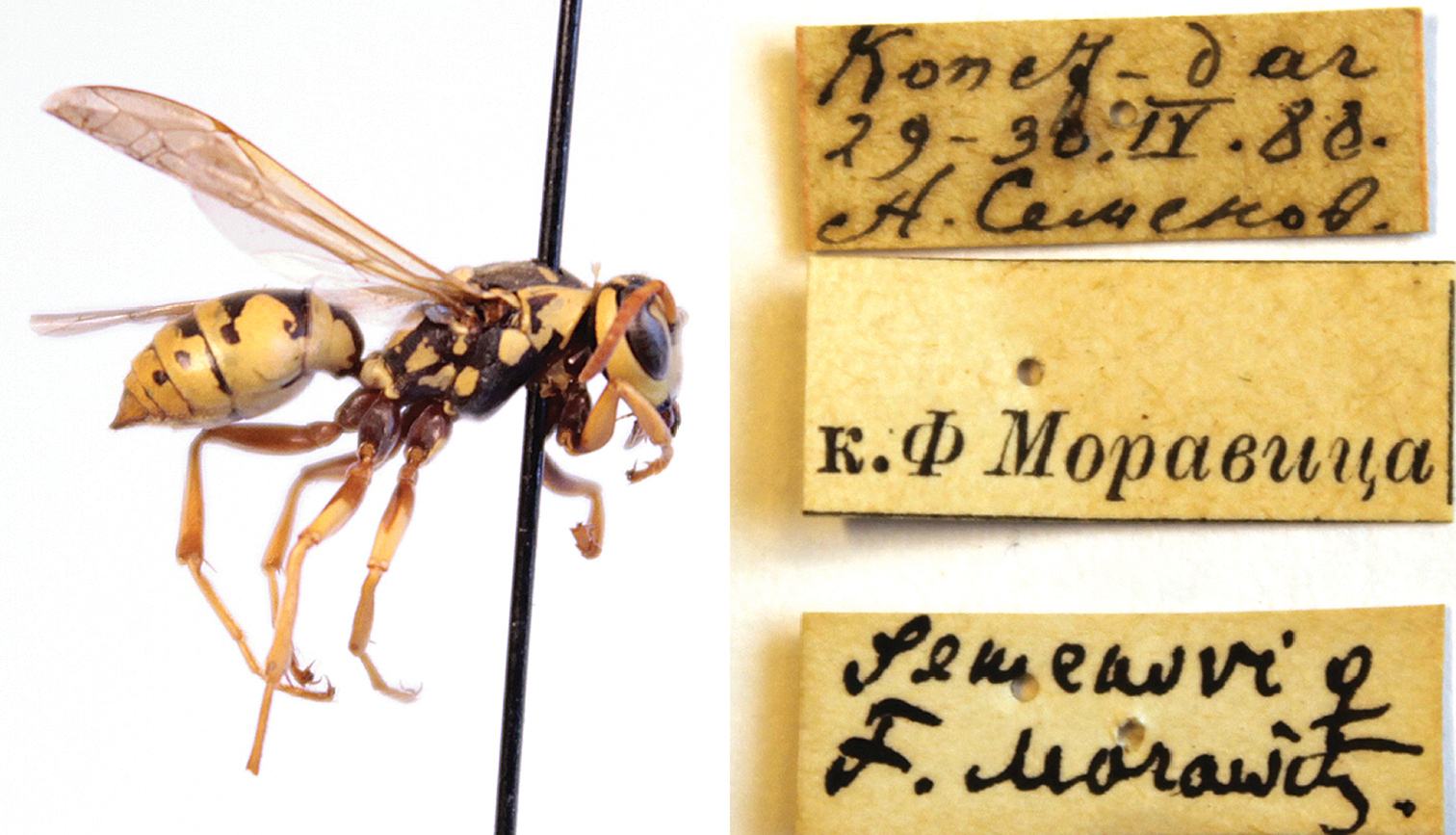
- Female

Scientific classification
- Kingdom: Animalia
- Phylum: Arthropoda
- Class: Insecta
- Order: Hymenoptera
- Family: Vespidae
- Subfamily: Polistinae
- Tribe: Polistini
- Genus: Polistes
- Species: P. semenowi

Binomial name
- Polistes semenowi Morawitz, 1889

Synonyms
- Polistes semenowii Dalla Torre, 1894 (Missp.); Polistes sulcifer Zimmermann, 1930; Pseudopolistes semenovi Weyrauch, 1937 (Missp.); Pseudpolistes sulcifer v. similator Zirngiebl, 1955

= Polistes semenowi =

Species of wasp

Polistes semenowi is a species of paper wasp in the genus Polistes that is found in southeastern and southern central Europe, as well as central Asia, and was until 2017 erroneously known by the name Polistes sulcifer, while a different species was incorrectly believed to represent P. semenowi (this species has been named Polistes austroccidentalis since 2017). It is one of only four known Polistes obligate social parasites, sometimes referred to as "cuckoo paper wasps", and its host is the congeneric species Polistes dominula. As an obligate social parasite, this species has lost the ability to build nests, and relies on the host workers to raise its brood. P. semenowi females use brute force, followed by chemical mimicry in order to successfully usurp a host nest and take over as the queen.

== Taxonomy and phylogeny ==
Polistes is the only genus in the tribe Polistini of the subfamily Polistinae. Species in this subfamily are one of several lineages often known as paper wasps. Polistes semenowi, first named by Morawitz in 1889, is a member of the monophyletic species group once known as Sulcopolistes, which contains only four species (the others being Polistes atrimandibularis, Polistes austroccidentalis, and Polistes maroccanus), all of them obligate social parasites on other Polistes species. Sulcopolistes was mistakenly thought to be an entirely different genus but was incorporated into the subgenus Polistes by Carpenter in 1991. Additionally, this species group is phylogenetically close to Polistes dominula, the only host species of P. semenowi.

== Description ==
Polistes semenowi, like most other paper wasps, are typically 0.7–1.0 inches long. Because it is a social parasite, it is adapted for fighting off the host species, and has some morphological distinctions. P. semenowi is known to have larger mandibles and anterior legs than those of related species. It also has a more square-shaped head, which is hypothesized to have evolved from the need for robust muscles to power the larger mandibles. Additionally, there is often a black band in the lower half of the clypeus. This trait in particular distinguishes it from its host species P. dominula. P. semenowi males typically have a more complete coloration of the body than the females, with the colors ranging from yellow to almost white.

A typical paper wasp nest resembles a papery material, and is made of saliva and fibers from wood and plants. P. semenowi, however, has lost the nest making ability. Instead, it relies on the nests of its host species Polistes dominula, whose nests are made of the typical paper material with many combs.

== Distribution ==
P. semenowi is found in southeastern and south-central Europe, as well as central Asia.

== Colony cycle ==
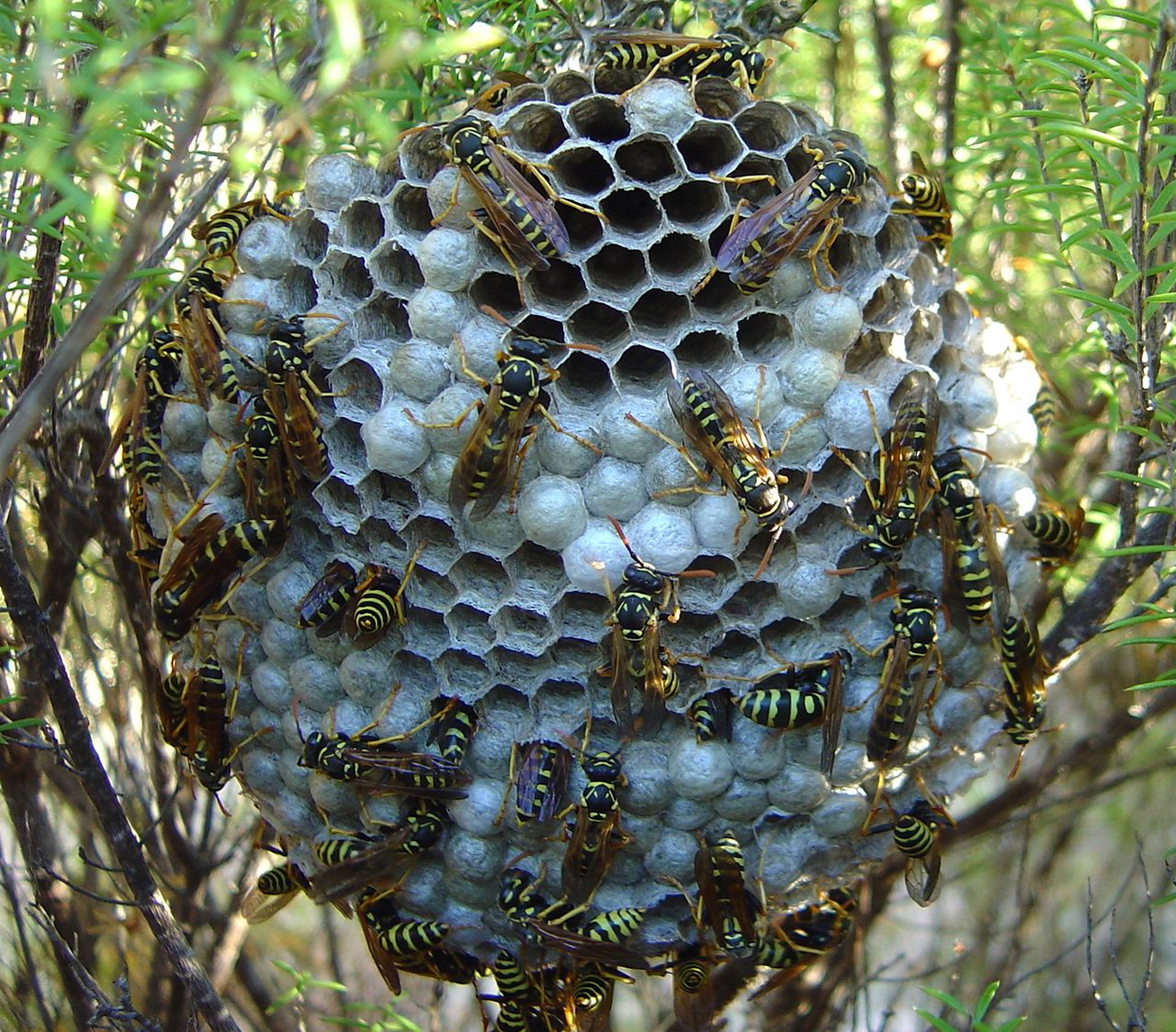
Nest of the yellow paper wasp, P. dominula, host to the cuckoo wasp

P. semenowi is a permanent workerless species, and consists only of reproductive males and females. Because P. semenowi is an obligate social parasite, its cycle depends heavily on that of its host species P. dominula, also known as the yellow paper wasp. As mentioned previously, P. semenowi queens (mated females) overwinter at high altitudes. Come May, they emerge. They tend to overwinter for a longer period of time than their host P. dominula, which emerges in April. This ensures that the parasites reach the host nest at the optimal time: just before worker emergence, when only the host foundresses are in the nest, leading to an easier invasion. Once a queen P. semenowi has successfully invaded a nest, the host nest is built up by the host workers after their emergence in early summer. P. semenowi has an annual cycle, and it has been shown that parasitic members only stay in the host nests for around 50 days. After emergence of the P. semenowi reproductive individuals, mating occurs, and fertilized females overwinter while males die off.

== Brood parasite ==
P. semenowi is an obligate social parasite. Even more specifically, it is a brood parasite. This means that they lay their eggs in the nests of other species and influence the host into providing the parental care for their young. The cuckoo (bird) is the most familiar example of a brood parasite, hence P. semenowi's common name, the cuckoo wasp.

P. semenowi has lost the ability to take care of its own young, so if an overwintering female fails to find a host nest to usurp, she leaves no offspring. A successful female relies on the host workers to care for her brood. The parasite brood develop from eggs to adults more quickly than the host brood, 25 days vs. 33 days respectively. Based on behavioral observations, host workers tended to visit parasite young much more frequently than host young, and each parasitic larva was visited much more often by a host worker than by its own mother. Surprisingly, it is not the parasite queen who is controlling this phenomenon, but it is the parasite larva that are somehow able to attract unrelated host workers on their own. One hypothesis is that the larva have 'hungry signs', much like in cuckoo birds, that manipulate the host workers into thinking they are still hungry. Since food supply during the larval stage dictates which caste a wasp will become, this manipulation of host workers is essential to P. semenowi because all larvae need to emerge as reproductives.

== Usurpation ==
In order for P. semenowi to have offspring, it must invade the nest of its host and exploit its colony. This invasion of a colony is called usurpation, and it is done in a very systematic way. After a long hibernation, the overwintering females, all fertilized queens, search for a host nest. The females emerge from overwintering relatively late, which allows them to look for a host colony before worker emergence, when there are only foundresses present in the nest. This allows for the simplest usurpation. When a suitable host nest is found, the female initially uses brute force to fight the host foundress and gain control of the nest. The outcome of these fights is often predicted by the relative body size of the two females. Most often, the host foundress is evicted or killed. Once inside the host nest, the P. semenowi female undergoes the process of changing her cuticular hydrocarbons to match that of the host colonies (more information on cuticular hydrocarbons can be found in the camouflage section). This helps the parasitic queen remain accepted by the host colony. The parasitic queen now controls the nest, and can lay her eggs. The host workers continue on as normal, raising both the host and parasite brood.

== Restlessness and hyperkinesis ==
Usurpation is only successful when done within a very specific seasonal time window, before emergence of the host workers. During this time window, a phenomenon has been observed that is called 'usurpation restlessness'. This is when a wasp's activity level increases during the ideal usurpation window, theoretically making usurpation easier. This increased activity level is shown even in the lab setting. In addition to usurpation restlessness, which occurs seasonally, P. semenowi females show hyperkinesis, or extra activity, in the middle of each day. This is thought to have evolved so the parasitic females are able to perform nest usurpations in the middle of the day, when the host species is out foraging, and so defense of the nest is lower.

== Behavior ==
=== Dominance hierarchy ===
The only known host of P. semenowi is P. dominula, a species that will often have multiple foundresses. If this is the case, then there is a dominance hierarchy present. There will be one dominant female, also known as the queen or alpha female, and one or more subordinate, or beta females. The dominant female spends her time laying eggs and interacting socially, while the subordinate females act much more like workers, spending time taking care of the brood and foraging. The dominant female is in charge of all of the workers. When the P. semenowi female enters the host nest for usurpation, she aggressively fights with the alpha P. dominula. If the usurpation is successful, the alpha P. dominula loses its dominant position, and is replaced by the P. semenowi female. The new female now adopts the chemical signature of the previous alpha and takes over all her previous duties. She is now the queen of the nest.

=== Reproductive suppression ===
As queen, the P. semenowi female is the only one allowed to lay eggs. Dapporto et al. hypothesized that the queen suppresses the reproductive capabilities of the other females using chemical signaling. If the alpha female is removed for any reason, the next subordinate female will take over her role as the reproductive. This is why the chemical mimicry of the P. dominula alpha females cuticular hydrocarbons is so important. Without matching the signal, the P. semenowi female will lose reproductive rights and will be unable to exploit the host's resources for its own reproduction, its ultimate goal as an obligate social parasite. Parasite females are unable to suppress subordinate reproduction completely. In comparison with unparasitized control nests, subordinate females under a parasite queens laid more eggs. This may suggest that P. dominula subordinate females are evolving a way to resist the parasitic females efforts.

=== Division of labor ===
Instead of labor being divided up within members of its own species, P. semenowi gives most of its labor to its host species. P. semenowi is a permanently workerless species, and cannot take care of its own brood, and so relies on P. dominula workers to do this for them. This work involves building up the nest, foraging, and feeding the young. Because P. semenowi consists only of reproductive males and females, the fertile reproductive female's main job is to successfully usurp a nest in order to raise her brood, while the reproductive male's primary job is to fertilize the reproductive females.

== Camouflage and mimicry ==
After a P. semenowi female has taken over a host nest, it changes its proportions of cuticular hydrocarbons (chemicals on the surface of all insects that play a role in chemical communication) to match that of the host. This is hypothesized to be done by two mechanisms. Camouflage is the term given to the process of acquiring the cuticular hydrocarbons directly from the host individuals or nest, while mimicry is the term given to describe the process where the hydrocarbons are produced by the parasite itself. P. semenowi is hypothesized to use both methods during usurpation. Upon invasion of the host nest, P. semenowi queens are observed rapidly stroking their abdomen on the host nest. This, along with grooming and licking of the host foundresses and workers, is thought to be the way that the P. semenowi queen camouflages herself in the host cuticular hydrocarbons. Chemical mimicry is thought to occur due to the presence of an enlarged Van der Vecht's organ on the abdomen of P. semenowi queens. This organ secretes chemicals involved in dominance recognition, and is thought to be enlarged in P. semenowi due to its need for quick chemical mimicry, before worker emergence. It has been shown that a full host cuticular signature is developed within only 3 days of usurpation.

== Diet ==
P. semenowi larvae feed on what P. dominula feeds on, since it is the host workers who are collecting the food. It has been found that P. dominula food is from three insect orders. P. dominula, unlike many other social wasps, is known as a very generalist predator, and is both opportunistic and very flexible in selecting their prey. Adult P. semenowi wasps have been shown to eat the larvae of other insect species including Tenebrio molitor larvae (a beetle species) and fly maggots. It has also been shown that the parasitic P. semenowi female may use the host eggs as nutrition soon after usurpation occurs. Additionally, in P. semenowi, a peculiar phenomenon is observed during usurpation season. The female is known to feed on flowers in the early morning and in the late afternoon. This is thought to have evolved so the female could attempt to usurp in the middle of the day, when the host is out feeding.
