= Christos (surname) =

Christos as a surname may refer to:

- Maria Devi Christos (born 1960), Ukrainian religious leader
- Jon Christos (born 1976), English musician

== See also ==
- Christ (surname)
