= Nicolaus Christ von Santz =

Grisons officer (1732–1799)

- Born: 1732
- Died: 18 February 1799 (aged 66–67) possibly Chur, Three Leagues
- Other name: Nicolaus Christ
- Occupations: Military officer; politician
- Spouse: Margarethe von Planta (m. 1785)

Nicolaus Christ von Santz (also Nicolaus Christ; 1732 – 18 February 1799) was an officer and politician from the Three Leagues. An officer in Spanish and Piedmontese service, he became a major general and was made a count in Piedmont, and in 1789 he was a founding member of the Grisons Patriots. He became widely known for his struggle for Margarethe, the only child of Peter von Planta: their secret wedding in 1785 and the abduction he arranged in 1786 occupied the Diet of the Three Leagues and the bishop of Chur.

== Biography ==
Nicolaus Christ von Santz was a member of the Christ family. He was the son of Nikolaus, a lieutenant in Sardinian service. Originally Reformed, he became a Catholic after 1782. He married Margarethe von Planta, daughter of Peter von Planta of Zernez.

Christ was an officer in Spanish and Piedmontese service, became a major general, and was made a count in Piedmont. From 1785 to 1787 he was podestà of Tirano in the Valtellina. In 1789 he was a founding member of the Grisons Patriots.

Christ became widely known for his struggle for the daughter of the influential Peter von Planta, who did not want to give his only child to a newly rich convert. The secret wedding in 1785, the subsequent imprisonment of the daughter by her father, her attempt to escape, and the abduction arranged by Christ in 1786 occupied the Diet of the Three Leagues (Bundstag) and the bishop of Chur, and provided material for literary works. He died on 18 February 1799, possibly in Chur.

== Bibliography ==
- J. Mathieu, Bauern und Bären, 1987
