= Christ family (Grisons) =

Family of Chur and the Prättigau

The Christ family is a family of councillors and guild members from the Grisons, originally from the Prättigau and recorded in Chur since the middle of the 17th century. Its most prominent member in the Prättigau line was the officer Nicolaus Christ von Santz. In Chur the family rose into the city's top leadership during the Helvetic Republic.

== History ==
The Christ family was originally at home in the Prättigau, and has also been recorded in Chur since the middle of the 17th century. The most prominent member of the Prättigau line is Nicolaus, a regiment commander in France. With the organist Johann Baptista (1759–1829), president of the municipality (Munizipalität) of Chur, the family rose into the top leadership of the city during the Helvetic Republic. His sons Ludwig and Johann Paul (1786–1844), editor of the Churer Zeitung, were first in foreign military service and then worked as journalists. Paul (1836–1908), pastor in Chur and rector of the cantonal school of the Grisons (Bündner Kantonsschule) in 1865–1869, was professor of theology at the University of Zurich from 1889 to 1907.

== Bibliography ==
- H. Berger, Evangelisch Chur, 1978, 109–111
- K. Huber (ed.), Rätisches Namenbuch, 3, 1986, 67
- Churer Stadtgeschichte, 2, 1993, 160–162
