= Christin Christ =

German politician (born 1989)

Member of the Hamburg Parliament
- Incumbent
- Assumed office 26 March 2025

Personal details
- Born: 29 August 1989 (age 37)
- Party: Christian Democratic Union (since 2013)

Christin Christ (born 29 August 1989) is a German politician serving as a member of the Hamburg Parliament since 2025. She previously served as a borough councillor of Wandsbek.
