= Ludwig Christ =

Swiss journalist and writer (1791–1876)

- Born: 16 August 1791; Chur, Three Leagues
- Died: 14 January 1876 (aged 84); Chur, Switzerland
- Occupations: Lawyer; journalist; writer
- Spouse: Elisabeth Fischer (m. 1822)

Ludwig Christ (16 August 1791 – 14 January 1876) was a Swiss lawyer, journalist and writer from Chur. He founded the Schweizerisches Volksblatt in Zurich in 1821. A liberal, he defended the 1839 revision of Chur's constitution in the Bündner Zeitung, which he edited from 1839 to 1841, and he was later an examining magistrate in Glarus.

== Biography ==
Ludwig Christ was born in Chur on 16 August 1791 into the Christ family. He was the son of Johann Baptist, head guild master (Oberzunftmeister), and Anna Poletti. In 1822 he married Elisabeth Fischer, daughter of Cyprian, a colonel from Chur. His father, an organist, was president of the municipality (Munizipalität) of Chur, and with him the family rose into the city's top leadership during the Helvetic Republic. His brother Johann Paul (1786–1844) was editor of the Churer Zeitung.

To escape the Napoleonic recruiters, Christ entered Piedmontese military service. He studied philosophy and law in Berlin, where his teachers included Georg Wilhelm Friedrich Hegel. In 1821 he founded the Schweizerisches Volksblatt in Zurich. He was a lawyer in Chur and a district captain (Kreishauptmann) in the Grisons militia, and later a lieutenant colonel in the Swiss general staff.

As head of the municipal chanceries of Chur, the liberal Christ helped push through the revision of the city's constitution in 1839, which he defended in the Bündner Zeitung, edited by him from 1839 to 1841. After his own newspaper, Der Morgenstern, failed, he was examining magistrate (Verhörrichter) in Glarus from 1842 to 1856. He edited the Rheinquellen in Chur from 1856 to 1860 and the Glarner Zeitung in 1860, and then traveled to North America.

Christ wrote a drama about Winkelried, as well as convivial and patriotic songs and occasional poems. He died in Chur on 14 January 1876.

== Bibliography ==
- R. Christoffel, Auf der Schwelle einer neuen Zeit, 1917, 67–79
- K. Goedeke, Grundriss zur Geschichte der deutschen Dichtung aus den Quellen, 12, 2nd edition, 1938, 177–178
