= Stephan Christ =

German politician (born 1991)

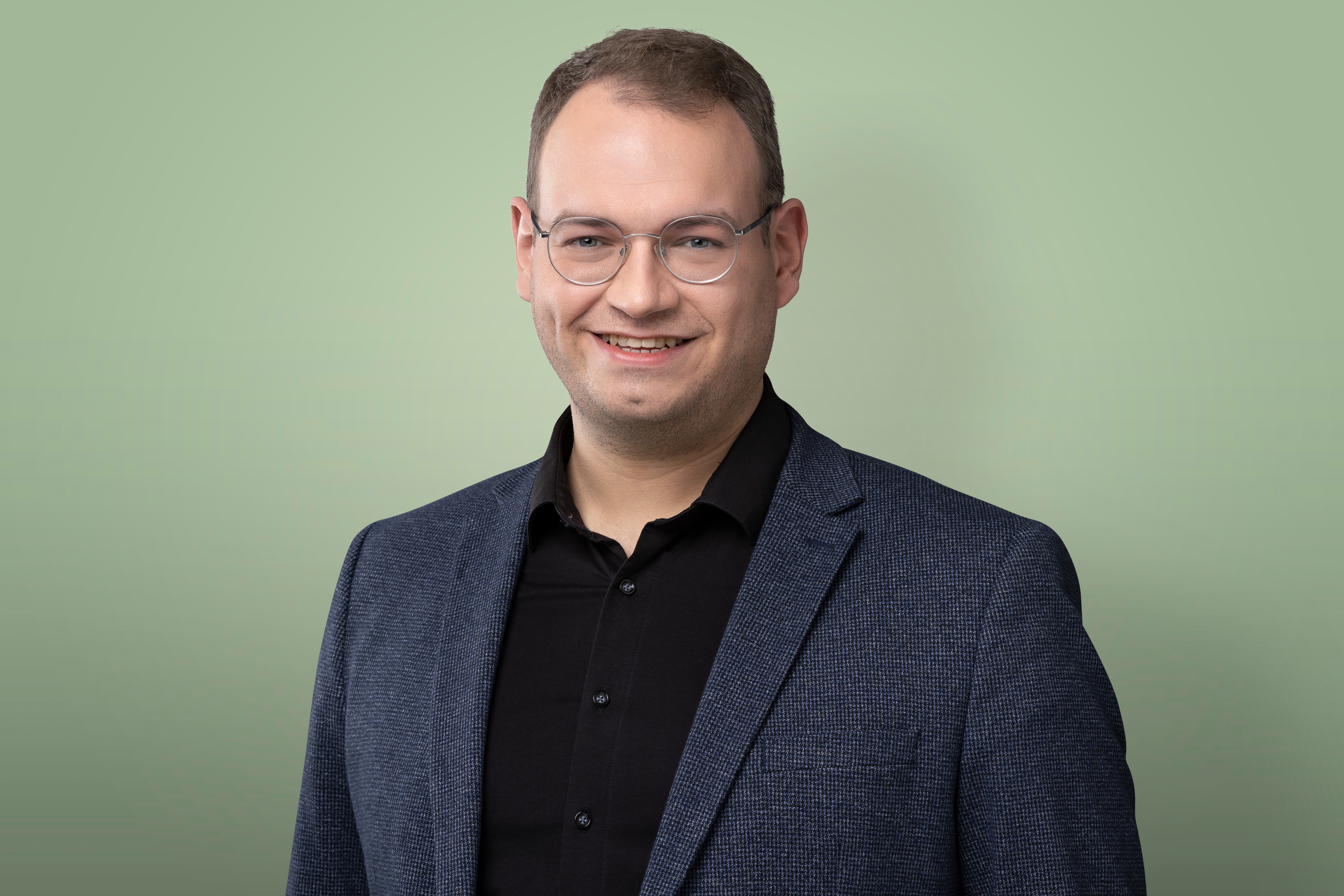
- Christ in 2023

Member of the Landtag of Lower Saxony
- Incumbent
- Assumed office 8 November 2022

Personal details
- Born: 13 January 1991 (age 35)
- Party: Alliance 90/The Greens (since 2013)

Stephan Christ (born 13 January 1991) is a German politician serving as a member of the Landtag of Lower Saxony since 2022. He has been a district councillor of Cloppenburg since 2021.
