= Johann Ludwig Christ =

German naturalist, gardener and pastor

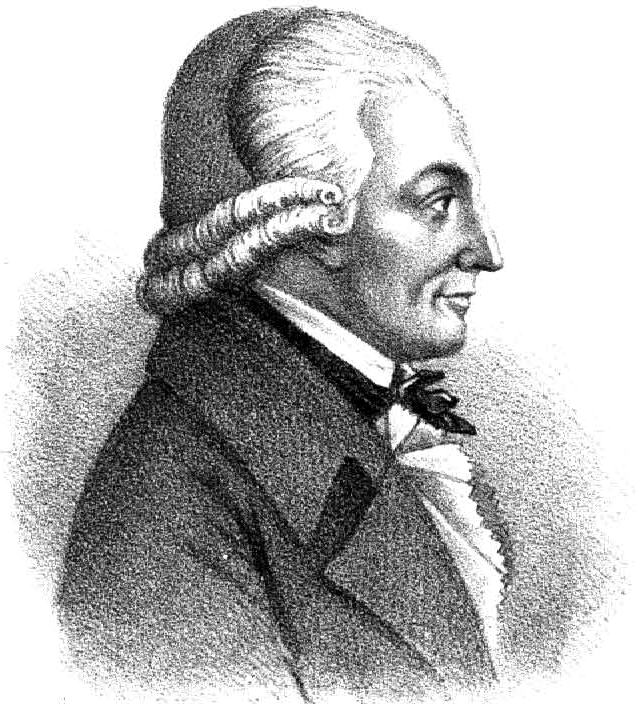
1872 portrait of Johann Ludwig Christ

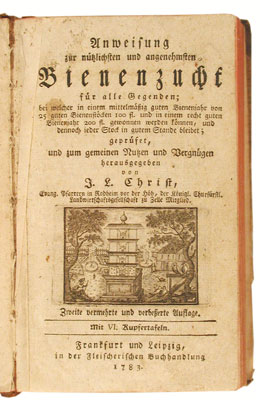
Title page of Christ's Anweisung zur nützlichsten und angenehmsten Bienenzucht für alle Gegenden

Johann Ludwig Christ (18 October 1739, in Öhringen – 19 November 1813, in Kronberg im Taunus) was a German naturalist, gardener, and pastor.

He was a specialist in the Hymenoptera. In 1791 he published Naturgeschichte, Klassifikation und Nomenklatur der Insekten vom Bienen, Wespen und Ameisengeschlecht. In 1791, he described Polistes dominula. He also studied fruit trees and wrote Vollständige Pomologie (2 volumes, 1809–1822).

== See also ==
- Parson-naturalist
