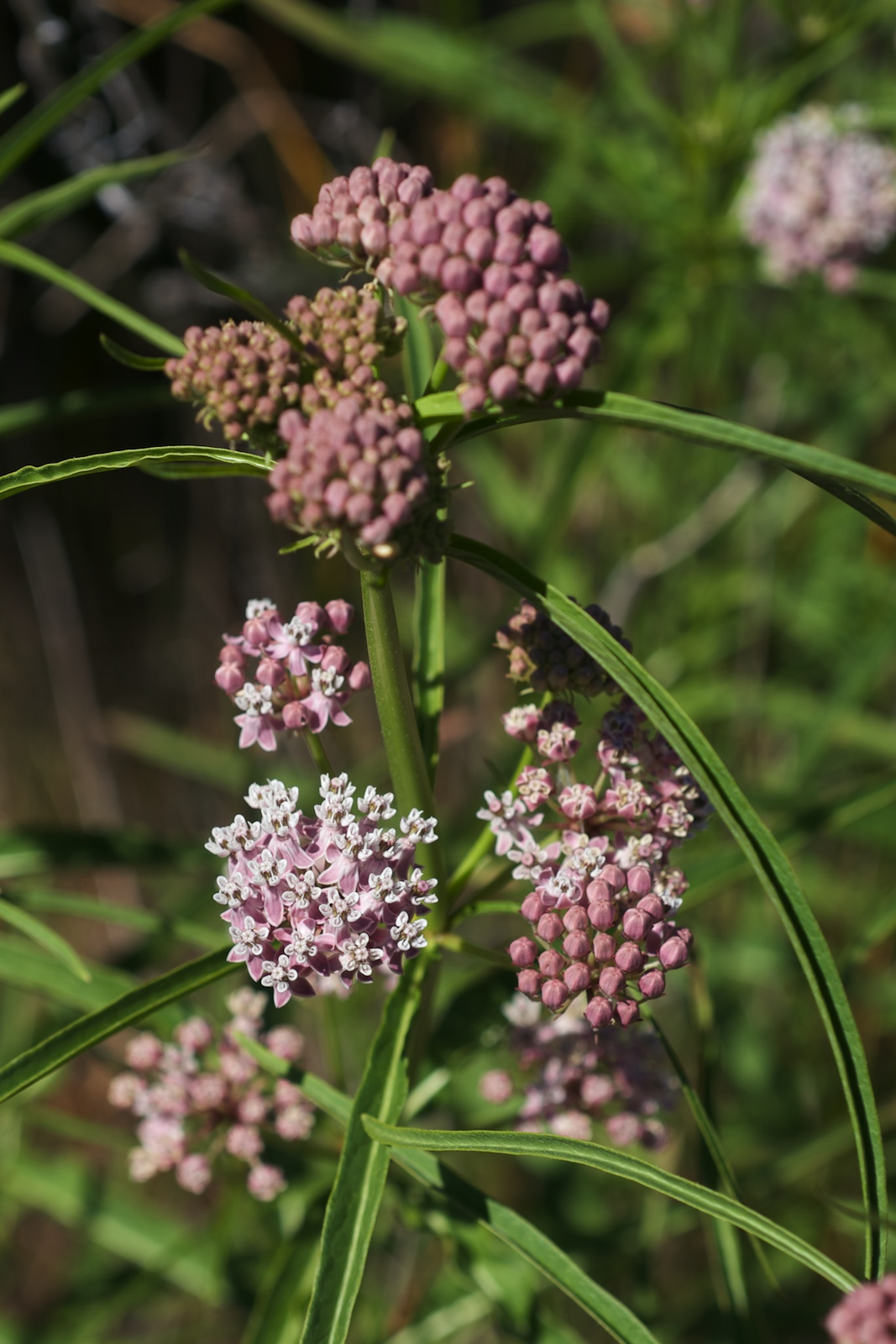

Conservation status
- Secure (NatureServe)

Scientific classification
- Kingdom: Plantae
- Clade: Tracheophytes
- Clade: Angiosperms
- Clade: Eudicots
- Clade: Asterids
- Order: Gentianales
- Family: Apocynaceae
- Genus: Asclepias
- Species: A. fascicularis

Binomial name
- Asclepias fascicularis Decne.

= Asclepias fascicularis =

Species of flowering plant

Asclepias fascicularis is a species of milkweed known by the common names narrowleaf milkweed and Mexican whorled milkweed. It is a perennial herb that grows in a variety of habitats.

== Description ==
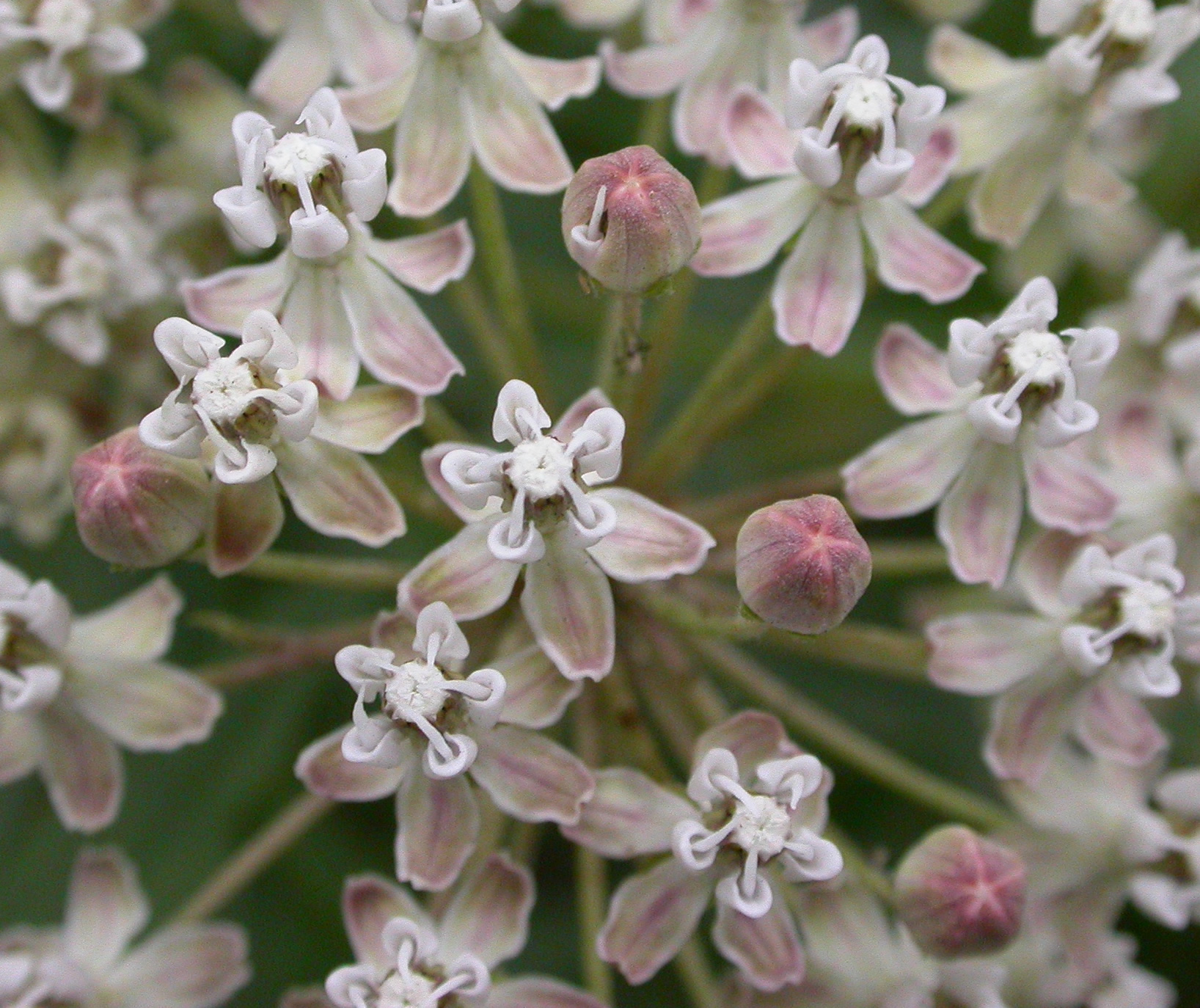
Closeup of flowers

Asclepias fascicularis is a flowering perennial herb sending up many thin, erect stems and bearing distinctive long pointed leaves which are very narrow and often whorled about the stem, giving the plant its common names.

It blooms in clusters of lavender, pale pink, purple, white, to greenish shades of flowers. They have five reflexed lobes that extend down away from the blossom. The flowers are 4–5 mm (0.16–0.20 in) and pedicels are 6–10 mm (0.2–0.4 in) in size.

The fruit pods are the smooth milkweed type, which split open to spill seeds along with plentiful silky hairs. They bloom from late spring to late summer.

== Distribution and habitat ==
The plant is a common perennial in the Western United States and Baja California. It is found in numerous habitats, including deserts, chaparral and woodlands, and montane locales below 7,000 feet (2,100 m).

== Uses ==
=== Monarch butterflies ===
Asclepias fascicularis is a specific monarch butterfly food and habitat plant. However, it provides negligible cardenolide content, a set of protective chemicals that reduce the virulence of the OE parasite and bird predation.

=== Cultivation ===
Asclepias fascicularis is cultivated by specialty nurseries as an ornamental plant. It is used in butterfly and wildlife gardens, and in native plant and drought tolerant gardens and natural landscaping projects.
