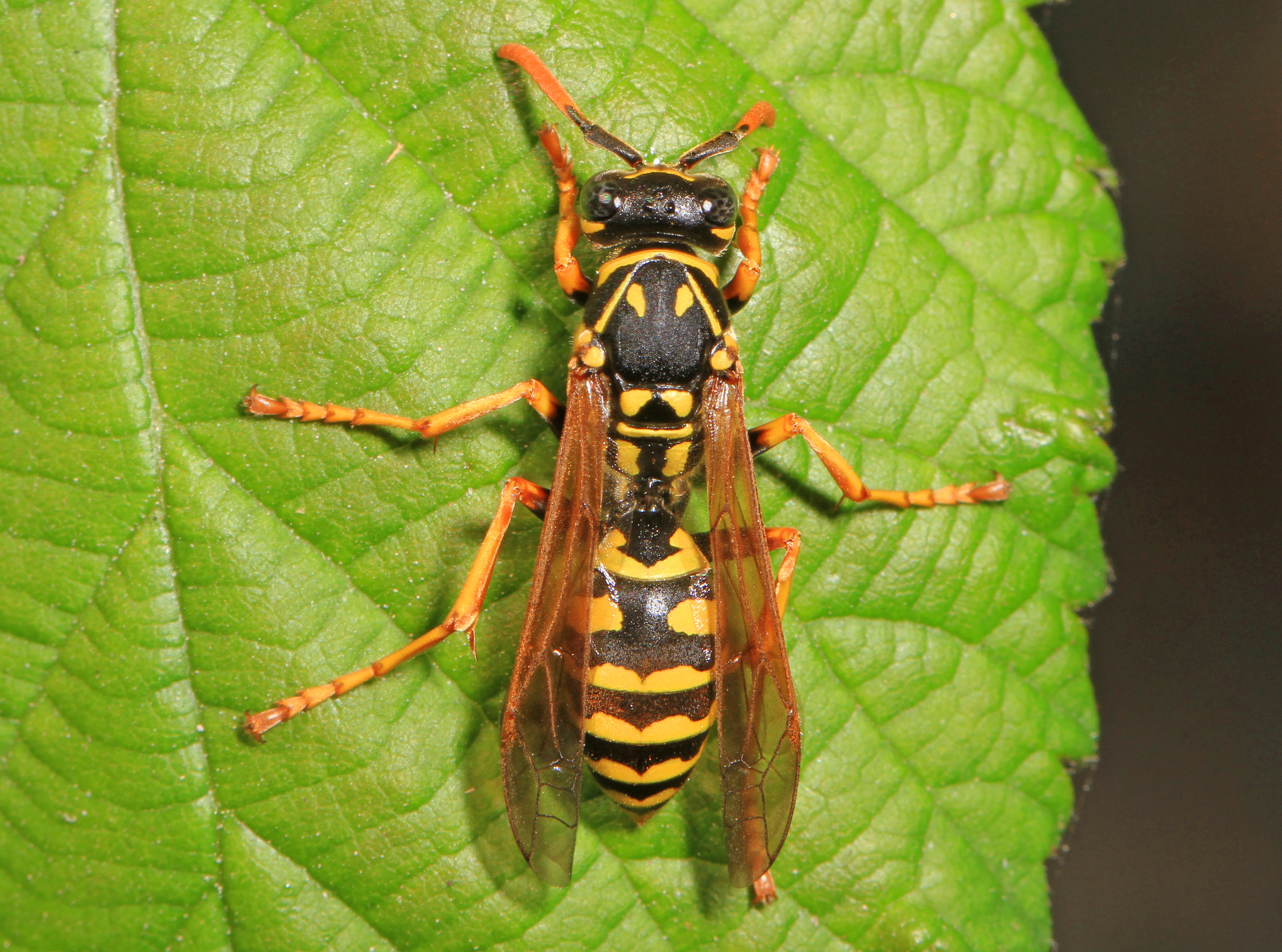
- P. dominula female photographed in British Columbia

Scientific classification
- Kingdom: Animalia
- Phylum: Arthropoda
- Clade: Pancrustacea
- Class: Insecta
- Order: Hymenoptera
- Family: Vespidae
- Genus: Polistes
- Species: P. dominula

Binomial name
- Polistes dominula (Christ, 1791)

= European paper wasp =

Species of wasp

The European paper wasp (Polistes dominula) is one of the most common and well-known species of social wasps in the genus Polistes. Its diet is more diverse than those of most Polistes species—many genera of insects versus mainly caterpillars in other Polistes—giving it superior survivability compared to other wasp species during a shortage of resources.

The dominant females are the principal egg layers, while the subordinate females ("auxiliaries") or workers primarily forage and do not lay eggs. This hierarchy is not permanent, though; when the queen is removed from the nest, the second-most dominant female takes over the role of the previous queen. Dominance in females is determined by the severity of the scatteredness in the coloration of the clypeus (face), whereas dominance in males is shown by the variation of spots of their abdomens. P. dominula is common and cosmopolitan due to their exceptional survival features such as productive colony cycle, short development time, and higher ability to endure predator attacks.

These wasps have a lek-based mating system. Unlike most social insects, 35% of P. dominula wasps in a colony are unrelated. It is considered an invasive species in Canada and the United States.

== Taxonomy ==
The European paper wasp was originally described in 1791 by Johann Ludwig Christ, and named Vespa dominula. The specific epithet dominula is a noun meaning "little mistress", and following the International Code of Zoological Nomenclature, species epithets which are nouns do not change when a species is placed in a different genus. Authors who were unaware that dominula was a noun have misspelled the species name as "dominulus" for decades. P. dominula is often referred to as the European paper wasp because of its native distribution and its nests, which are constructed from paper and saliva. It is also frequently referred to in older literature as Polistes gallicus, a separate species with which it was often confused.

== Description and identification ==
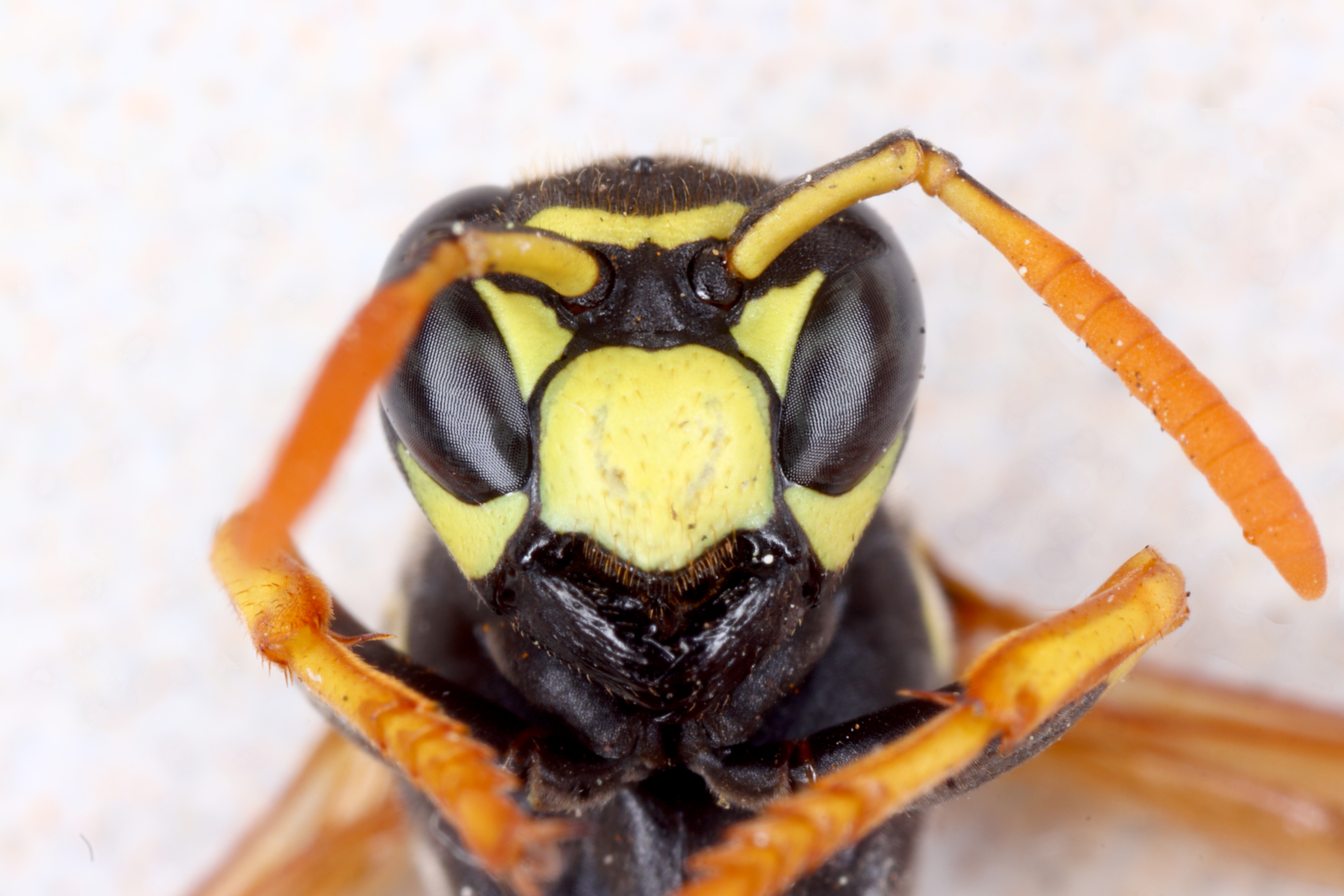
Close-up of the head

Little variation occurs among individuals of P. dominula; the wing lengths of males range from 9.5 to 13.0 millimetres (3/8 to 1/2 in), while those of females range from 8.5 to 12.0 millimetres (5/16 to 1/2 in). Its body is colored entirely yellow and black, similar to that of Vespula germanica, one of the most common and defensive wasps in its native range. The female mandible is black and sometimes has a yellow spot. Females have a black subantennal mark that rarely has a pair of small, yellow spots. The female vertex sometimes has a pair of small, yellow spots behind the hind ocelli. Mesoscutum with paired yellow comma-shaped spots, rarely minute or absent. Apical half of antenna uniformly orange-yellow dorsally and ventrally. In females, sternite VI is usually completely or at least in the apical part yellow. In males, clypeus not or slightly depressed medially and lateral ridges absent dorsally or slightly developed, its apical margin is triangular; typically, apical antennal segment comparatively stout and dorsally about 1.5 times as long as wide basally.

=== Variations amongst individuals ===
Although the wasps do not display much conspicuous variation that enables one to tell them apart with the naked eye, definite features are unique to each individual. For example, the abdominal spots on males of P. dominula vary in sizes, locations, and patterns. They act as sexually selective signals and also are associated with social hierarchy within the colonies. Males with smaller, regular patterns of spots are more aggressive and dominant over those with larger, irregular patterns. Similarly, females' appearance varies between individuals and is associated with their social rank. The larger and the more scattered the clypeus marks on the foundress, the higher the probability that she is dominant over other females.

== Distribution ==
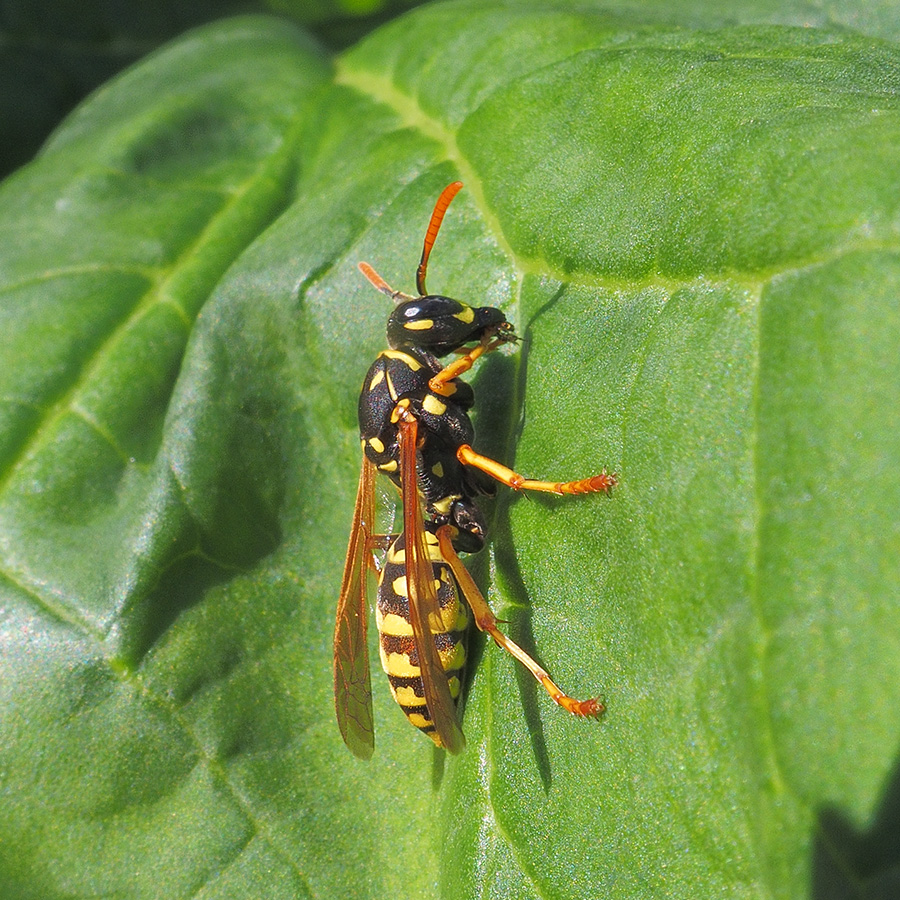
P. dominula in the Netherlands

The native range of P. dominula covers much of southern Europe and North Africa, and temperate parts of Asia as far east as China. It has also been introduced to New Zealand, Australia, South Africa, and North and South America. Since the mid-1980s, the population of P. dominula has expanded to rather cooler regions, especially towards northern Europe. Global warming is speculated to have raised temperatures of certain areas, allowing P. dominula to expand to originally cooler regions.

The first North American occurrence of P. dominula was reported in Massachusetts in the late 1970s, and by 1995, this species had been documented throughout the northeastern USA. Since then, the species have been observed as far west as Colorado as early as 2013. Although detailed mechanisms of the species' dispersal are still unknown, some number of individuals, including the foundresses, may have hidden inside transportable items such as shipping crates, trailers, boats, or other human-made structures used during international trading between countries.

=== Habitat ===
P. dominula generally lives in temperate, terrestrial habitats such as chaparral, forest, and grassland biomes. They also have the propensity to colonize nearby human civilizations because man-made structures can act as great shelters and also are located close to the resources such as food.

=== Spread within North America ===
Behavioral adaptations of P. dominula have allowed it to expand outside its native range and invade the United States and Canada. While most Polistes species in the United States feed only on caterpillars, P. dominula eats many different types of insects. It also nests in areas with better protection, so is able to avoid predation that has affected many other Polistes species. Much of North America has a very similar ecology and habitat to that of Europe, and this has allowed a faster and more successful colonization. P. dominula was also compared to and found to be more productive than Polistes fuscatus, which is indigenous to the United States and Canada. P. dominula produces workers about a week earlier and forages earlier in the day than P. fuscatus. It is a concern for cherry and grape growers in British Columbia, as it injures the fruit by biting off the skin. It also spreads yeast and fungi that harm fruit and can be a nuisance to workers and pickers at harvest.

==== Displacement of native species ====
Before 1995, P. fuscatus was the only species of Polistes in Michigan. In the spring of 1995, one single founder colony of P. dominula was discovered nesting in the Polistes nestbox at the Oakland University Preserve in Rochester, Michigan. In 2002, about one-third of the P. dominula colonies at the preserve were removed because of the concern about losing the resident population of P. fuscatus. Although the removal of P. dominula population did slow down their expansion, in 2005, 62% of the colonies at the Preserve were P. dominula. A number of researchers concluded that P. dominula was likely replacing P. fuscatus through indirect or exploitative competition, which was consistent with their finding that P. dominula was significantly more productive than P. fuscatus.

In Colorado, however, P. dominula has not been observed displacing native species. Polistes species native to Colorado strongly prefer environments far from human settlement, while P. dominula frequently settles directly on and around buildings.

== Genetic variations ==
Introduced populations of P. dominula contain relatively high levels of genetic diversity and these variations are most likely due to different dispersal events. Through genetic observations of diverse regional P. dominula populations, an allelic richness and distribution of private alleles was shown in the introduced population, as well as the oldest population (Massachusetts) had the lowest level of genetic variation. Various dispersion mechanisms existed amongst the P. dominula species and its origin might not be confined to a single regional area. Furthermore, the genetics of Southern Californian population differed from those of both Eastern and Northern California, suggesting the source of the Southern Californian population may be from either an unsampled area with the introduced range or from a different geographic area from within the native range.

=== Behaviors influenced by genetic diversity ===
==== Colony founding ====
Typically, a Polistes colony is founded by a single or a small group of females that have just emerged from hibernation during the winter. They generally prefer warmer climates and initiate construction of new nests. However, a different approach has been observed during the spring colony-founding phase of P. dominula in some areas of North America, where a large group of more than 80 wasps aggregated to reuse and expand an old nest. Such an unusual nesting method is thought to contribute to the extremely extensive spread of the P. dominula species in novel areas where it might otherwise be difficult for newcomer individuals to find conspecifics.

== Life cycle ==
Overwintering founding queens, or foundresses, spend about a month in the spring constructing a nest and provisioning offspring, the first of which become daughter workers in the growing colony. One or more foundresses begin the colonies in the spring. If multiple foundresses are present, the one that lays the most eggs will be the dominant queen. The remaining foundresses will be subordinate and do work to help the colony.

Males are produced later, and when they start to appear, a few daughters may mate and leave their nest to become foundresses the next season. The switch from production of workers to production of future foundresses (gynes) is not utterly abrupt, as has been considered the case for other species of Polistes. Males are often distinguished from female wasps by their curled antennae and lack of a stinger.

The colony disperses in the late summer, with only males and future foundresses produced instead of workers, and individuals frequently clustering in groups (called a hibernaculum) to overwinter. Hibernation does not usually take place on former nest sites.

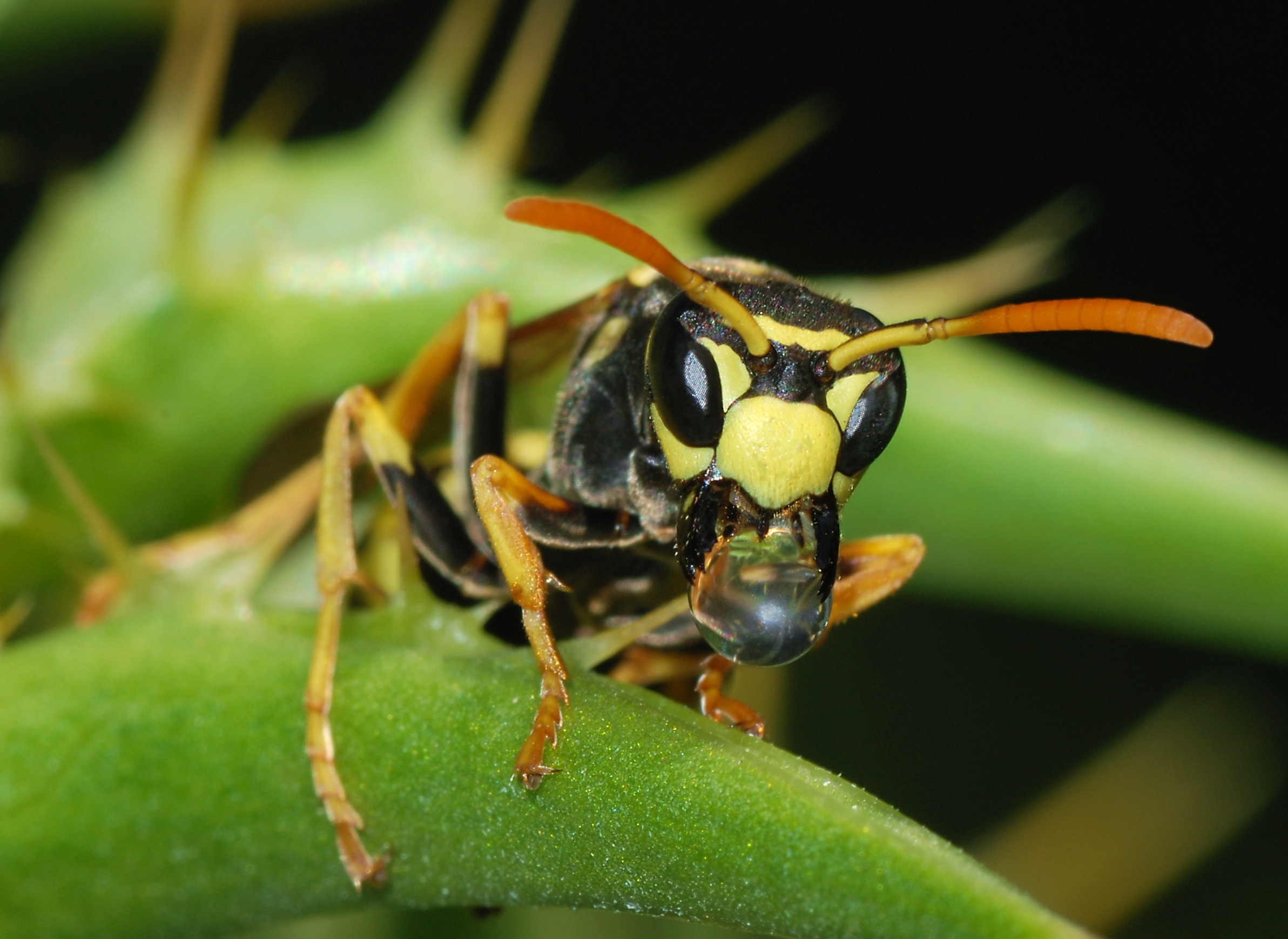
Paper wasp with regurgitated nectar

Social hierarchies established within the colony can also influence individual P. dominula's longevity. Queens live longer than the males or the workers because the workers protect the queens from predators. The queen starts laying eggs in late March or early April, immediately after the "founding phase" of the newly built nest. Then, the colony disperses in the late summer, with only males and future foundresses produced instead of workers. Although individuals frequently cluster in groups (to overwinter), neither most nonreproductive males nor nonreproductive females survive the winter because their lifespans are shorter than a year (around 11 months) and they best survive during warm temperatures. Queens may survive the winter by hibernating.

== Survival advantages ==
Many regions have been reported which were originally home for P. fuscatus have slowly altered to that of P. dominula. A few possible factors contribute to the prevalence of P. dominula over P. fuscatus, specifically in settling into a territory. Some of the factors include productive colony cycle, short developmental time, aposematic coloration, a generalist diet, and the ability to colonize new environments.

=== Colony cycle ===
P. dominula colonies are established by females that have left their natal combs to mate and find new settlements. These "foundresses" use three major strategies to establish new colonies, including building a nest by herself, finding "associate foundresses" to build the nest together, and sitting and waiting for the original foundress to leave the nest and then displace her. Once the foundresses have settled, the "founding phase" is over and is followed by the "worker phase", where the first generation of offspring are produced and grow as workers.

P. dominula appears to have relatively high colony productivity as compared to other Polistes species. In matched comparisons of field colonies in Michigan, single foundress colonies of P. dominula were four to five times as productive as the colony cycle of P. fuscatus. In North America, P. dominula was significantly more productive than comparable colonies of the native Polistes metricus.

=== Short development time ===
The relatively high productivity of P. dominula may be correlated to the timing of its brood development. Compared to that of other Polistes species, P. dominula brood developmental period is much shorter. For instance, P. dominula produces its first workers much earlier than the native P. metricus, a native North American species. Similarly, when compared to P. fuscatus, P. dominula workers were produced about 6 days earlier even when their egg-hatching dates were the same. This indicated that the development times for the larvae and pupae, though not the eggs, were significantly shorter in P. dominula than in P. fuscatus.

The precise reasons that P. dominula has such shorter brood development times are unknown, but a number of conjectures are offered. At the mechanical level, both genetic factors (e.g., smaller adult body size) and environmental influences (e.g., higher provisioning levels) may play a role. In a different aspect, the selection pressure exerted by the European social parasites such as Polistes sulcifer and Polistes semenowi might have caused the developmental times in P. dominula to be shorter. Because these parasites normally attack the host nests just prior to worker emergence, it would be advantageous for P. dominula to have a shortened brood developmental time.

=== Generalist diet ===
A European paper wasp takes a monarch butterfly caterpillar from within a narrow leaf milkweed umbel. Part is shown at one fourth speed.

A European paper wasp preying on Milkweed aphids which are on narrow leaf milkweed. Most scenes are repeated at one-fourth speed.

Like other social wasps, their diet is divided into two types: carbohydrate — from flower nectar, fruit juice, and plant vegetative organs, as well as the sweet secretions of homoptera, and protein — from animal tissue. P. dominula has a more generalist protein diet than many other Polistes species, giving it a more flexible selection of prey. One study in Europe found that the prey items brought back to nests by P. dominula colonies represented three insect orders. In other Eastern European studies, the prey spectrum included larvae of representatives of five orders: Lepidoptera, Hymenoptera, Coleoptera, Orthoptera, Hemiptera, and adult flies (Diptera). While in contrast, North American Polistes primarily only use caterpillars to feed their offspring. Some other theories, however, suggested not that individuals have a more general diet, but that the response of colonies may be more opportunistic relative to resources. For example, P. dominula uses more workers to increase the amount of foraging, use eggs to feed the offspring, and reduce allocation of protein to nest construction to take advantage of poorer quality prey during periods of low prey availability. In Kentucky, P. dominula has been observed hunting Monarch butterfly caterpillars.

=== Imaginal protein nutrition ===
Unlike many other wasps, which hunt solely to feed their larvae, adult females and males of P. dominula often consume insects solely for their own needs. However, they are unable to consume the solid tissues of their prey, instead chewing it for a long time, sucking out the liquids, and then discarding the dry residue. Experiments have shown that feeding foundresses on caterpillars during the period between the end of hibernation and nest initiation has a beneficial effect on egg development.

=== Strong defense against predation ===
Another strength of P. dominula in terms of survival rate is their ability to suffer less nest predation than other Polistes. dominula is a less attractive prey for birds mainly due to its aposematic coloration and the relatively strong attachment of the comb to the substrate – typically tree branches or man-made structures. Unlike P. fuscatus, which is colored brown with a few faint, thin, yellow stripes, P. dominula is colored bright yellow with alternating black, similar to the warning coloration of Vespula germanica, a common and aggressive yellowjacket. In addition to their alerting coloration, P. dominula comb strength also contributes to their higher chance of survival. P. dominula might have an advantage over P. fuscatus against avian predators because their combs are less likely to be dislodged from the substrate by birds because the side force required to dislodge it is greater for P. dominula than for P. fuscatus combs.

== Dominance hierarchy ==
=== Caste system ===
Hierarchies in social insects serve two functions: to allow a single reproducing individual to emerge, and to enable the progressive exclusion of nonreproducing individuals from the nest space.

Morphologically, few differences are seen between the foundress and subordinate members of the colony. However, behavioral differentiation does occur, with the role an individual female takes being determined by social interaction within the colony. Dominant females, also known as the queens, are the principal egg-layers. Queens occupy the nest, oviposit, and rarely forage. In comparison, auxiliaries (the workers), or subordinate females, primarily forage and do not lay eggs. Autumnal helpers display a unique, behavioral phenotype demonstrated by only a small percentage of workers. These individuals leave their natal nest to overwinter to found new colonies in the spring. Compared to nonhelpers, these helpers exhibit higher overall levels of activity, demonstrating higher frequencies of behaviors. Specifically, they gave more trophallaxis, attacked more, and received more ritualized dominance behavior (RDB). Nonhelpers received more trophallaxis and performed more RDB. The survival rate of helpers is around 14%, while the survival rate of nonhelpers is around 59%.

These behavioral divisions are not permanent. For instance, if an alpha female is removed from a nest, then another female, usually the second-most dominant, beta female, assumes the role and behavioral profile of the removed dominant. Indeed, individuals alternate between different profiles of behavior within their own dominance rank position. When larvae were artificially removed, the frequency of worker reproduction increased. Therefore, workers lay eggs when they perceive a decline in queen power, as demonstrated by artificially empty cells.

The interactions of females in the nest can influence which daughters become workers and which become gynes. Despite some minor physiological differences (primarily in the fat body), gyne-destined females produced late in the colony cycle can be induced to become workers if placed on nests that are at an earlier stage of colony development, and the reverse is also true. This indicates a significant degree of flexibility in the caste system of this species.

=== Female dominance ===
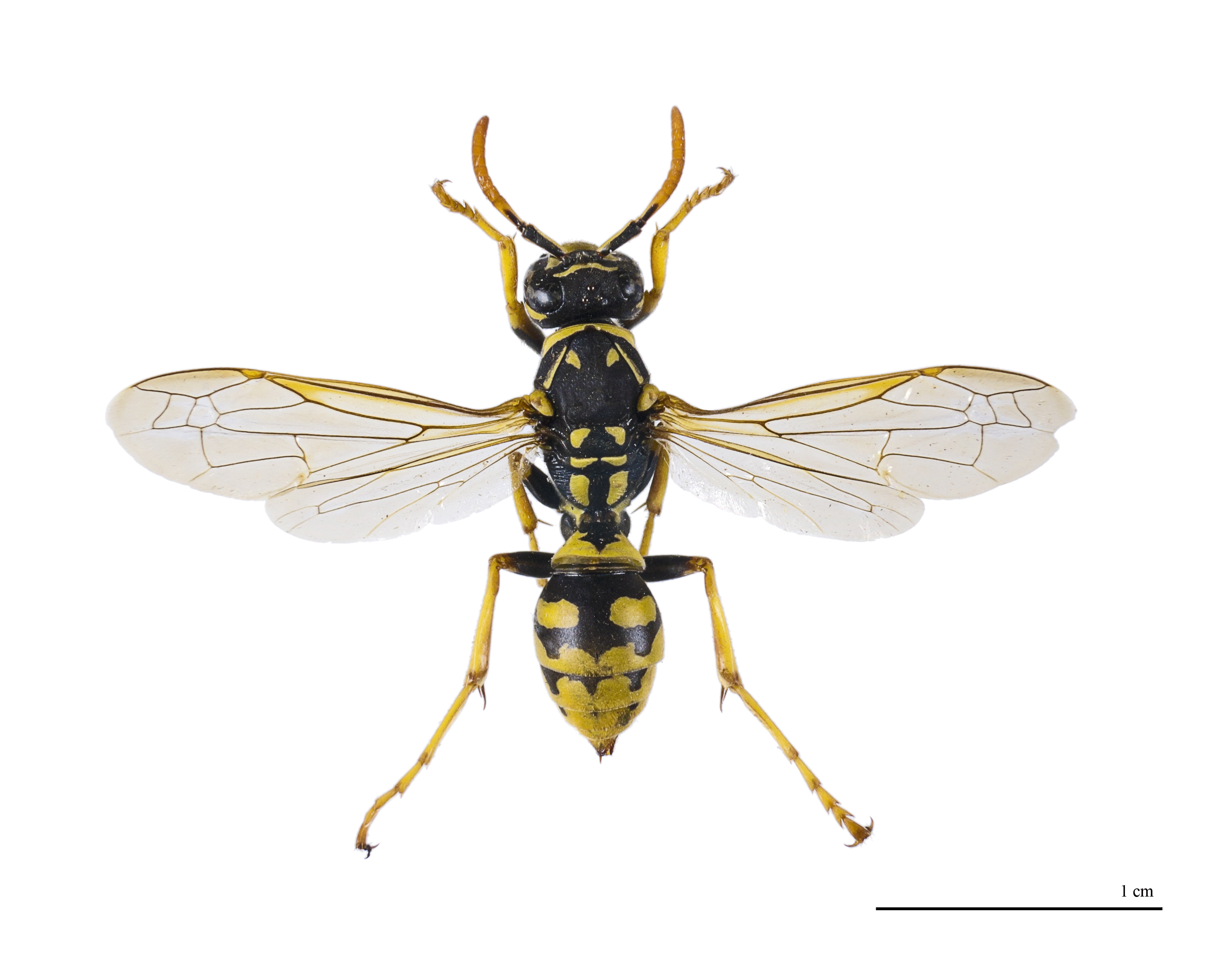
P. dominula female

Typically, the alpha female dominates all other individuals of a colony, laying the majority of eggs and partaking in differential oophagy. The alpha female devotes much of her time to social interaction, in comparison to subordinates that are much more involved in foraging and brood care. The clypeus - the yellow region above the mouth, in other words the face - is extremely variable in number, size, and shape of black spots, and this variation correlates to dominance; more dominant individuals have more black spots. The arrival at the nest correlates with the dominance hierarchy. Therefore, individuals that join the nest later are seldom dominant.

P. dominula shows distinct behavioral differences in response to face marking. Researchers used paint to alter the number of facial spots on two wasps of the same size after killing them. They put these dead wasps as guards in front of food sources and introduced a third wasp to see where this wasp would go. The third wasps chose the food source that was guarded by the wasp with fewer spots 39 of 48 times. Therefore, the dominance of wasps of the same size is predicted by facial coloring, with more dominant individuals having more spots. Researchers experimented to determine whether social costs maintain the honesty of facial signals. They altered the facial coloring of wasps and then put them together to battle. The winner is clearly identified by mounting the loser while the loser lowers its antennae. While the manipulation of coloring did not affect which won the battle for dominance, it did significantly affect the behavior after the battle. Losers that were painted with more spots experienced six times more aggression than controls that had not been painted. The honesty of facial coloring is explained by social costs that are imposed when wasps do not signal honestly.

=== Male dominance ===
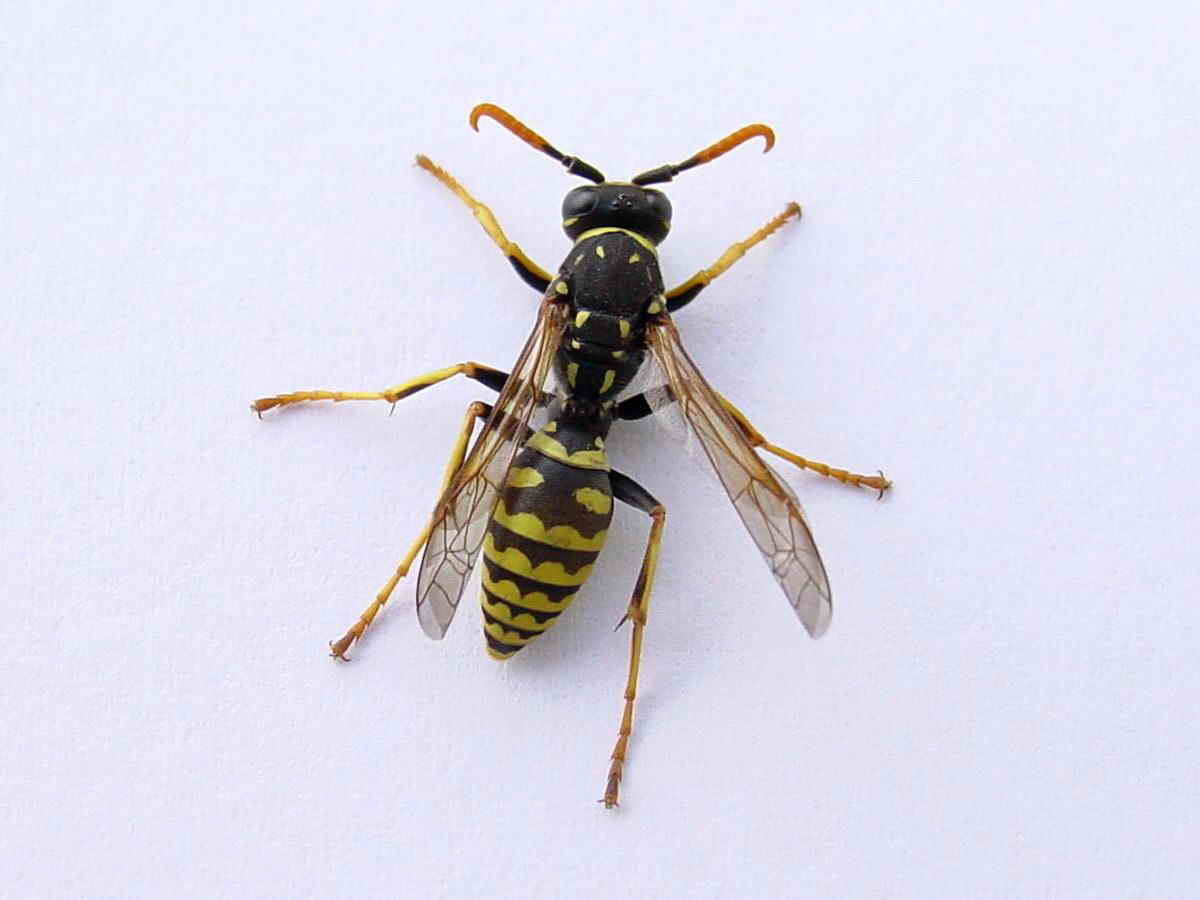
P. dominula male

Male abdominal spots correlate with dominance. Smaller, elliptically shaped spots reflect a more dominant male that is preferred by females and wins competitions with other males. This is in contrast to males with larger, irregularly shaped abdominal spots that are generally subordinate and less sexually successful. Males cannot sting and would solely have only their mandibles as a form of defense.

=== Abdomen-stroking behaviors ===
Abdomen rubbing of the female P. dominula occurs during the egg stage of the colonies, more in multiple-female colonies than in solitary colonies. Several functions of female abdominal rubbing are possible, one of them being painting predator-resistant chemicals on the surface of the nest for defense. In particular, it has been experimentally shown that the secretion of the Van der Vecht's gland of P. dominula (in the article, erroneously referred to as Polistes gallicus) has a repellent effect on ants. A second possible function is to communicate the dominance status of the female to the young brood. Alpha females perform abdomen stroking more than subordinate females. After an alpha female is removed, subordinates increase their abdomen stroking rate. The substances secreted during the rubbing have two potential functions: repressing future ovarian development in the brood or informing the brood of which adult female is the dominant individual.

== Relatedness ==
P. dominula is a social insect that lives in colonies. They are haplodiploid insects, as are other Polistes species. The haploid males produce identical haploid sperm, and diploid females produce haploid eggs through meiosis. In most social insects, colonies are composed of related individuals, and social insects are assumed to help close relatives according to W. D. Hamilton's theory of kin selection. However, in P. dominula, 35% of the nest mates are unrelated. In many other species, unrelated individuals only help the queen when no other options are present. In this case, subordinates work for unrelated queens even when other options may be present. No other social insect submits to unrelated queens in this way. This seemingly unfavorable behavior parallels some vertebrate systems. This unrelated assistance may be evidence of altruism in P. dominula.

The majority of nests had one or more females that were unrelated, especially in the winter before nests are formed and workers born. The nests tend to form from foundresses of different nests from previous years. The foundresses are also found overwintering with other wasp species, showing why unrelated wasps are found during winter. However, after winter when the nests are starting to be formed, an increase in relatedness in the nests is seen, which could result from foundresses searching for more related sisters, instead of unrelated wasps. After winter, as wasps leave their winter areas and return to their nests, an increase in relatedness occurs in the early nest phase. In later stages of the nest, more unrelated wasps are found, which could be because new wasps join established nests.

== Recognition ==
=== Use of cutical hydrocarbons ===
P. dominula females are able to distinguish between nestmates and non-nestmates. Triads of wasps show more discrimination and aggression toward non-nestmates than dyads of wasps. In triads, aggression is increased because a defense of the nest can be shared with other nestmates, but for an individual, the cost of the aggression is greater than the benefit of the defense. Insect body surface is coated with cuticular hydrocarbons (CHC) for waterproofing. These chemicals also contribute to recognition among individuals, kin, and nest mates. The same cuticle that the adults have are coated on the nests, allowing the wasps to recognize their home. An analysis of the differences in CHC profiles between dominant and subordinate females found that while differences are not clear at the early stages of nest founding, these differences become prominent upon worker emergence. The CHC profiles of the dominant female exhibit a greater proportion of distinctive unsaturated alkenes of longer chain length compared to those of subordinates. When the queen is removed, the replacement queen's CHC profile becomes similar to that of the original queen. Upon analyzing whether CHC is a signal for fertility or dominance, researchers concluded that it is a signal for dominance because subordinates with developed ovaries still exhibited profiles that differed from those of dominants.

=== Sexually selected signals in males ===
Males of P. dominula use their physical features to sexually appeal to the females and copulate. They have a pair of yellow dorsal abdominal spots that act as sexually selected signals. The size, location, and coloration of the spots also determine the males' hierarchy, mating success (being preferred/rejected by females) and victory in male-male competition. Females preferred males with smaller, more regular spots. Similarly, those "preferred" males were more likely to be the dominant males in the population by winning more same-sex fights, compared to those with larger, irregularly shaped spots.

=== Visual signals of status and rival assessments ===
Black facial patterns are associated with the male P. dominula dominance and conditions. Facial patterns of the male P. dominula vary from being "unbroken" to "scattered" – an unbroken black spot represents "low quality" while scattered spots (having several spots) represent "high quality". Males generally avoid fighting with "high quality" males and fight for resources that "low quality" males are protecting to reduce the cost of aggressive competition. Naturally, such behaviors give rise to social hierarchy, placing males with more spots on top of the social class.

Similar to the abdominal spots that imply strong fighting fitness and mating success in male P. dominula, the salient patterns on the female's clypeus demonstrate strong correlation to its dominance and is used to facilitate rival assessments.

=== Dufour's gland secretion ===
The use of cuticular hydrocarbons (CHCs) in recognizing nest mates and neighbors is a relatively well-known method for Hymenoptera, especially among Polistes. However, Dufour's gland secretion has also been discovered to contribute in such assessments of invaders and nest mates. Chemical analysis of the Dufour's gland secretion revealed that it has a very similar composition as the cuticular hydrocarbons. However, a big difference was that cuticular hydrocarbons had more linear hydrocarbons than the glands and dimethylalkanes were more prevalent in gland secretions. Significantly different dimethylalkanes were found in foundresses belonging to different colonies, suggesting that these could be used to discriminate species of different origins.

=== Roles of cuticular hydrocarbons in larvae ===
Because the chemicals coated on the nests are equivalent to that present in adult P. dominula bodies, young wasps learn this chemical template in the very early state of the adult life to later on be able to distinguish their nest mates from non-nest mates. The CHC composition of the larvae and adults are very different, in that the larvae's relative abundance of low-molecular-weight cuticular hydrocarbons is higher and that the larval profiles are more uniform than those of adults. Adults are also able to distinguish odors of their own colonial larval cuticular hydrocarbons from those of foreign colonies.

== Behavior ==
=== Foundress behavior ===
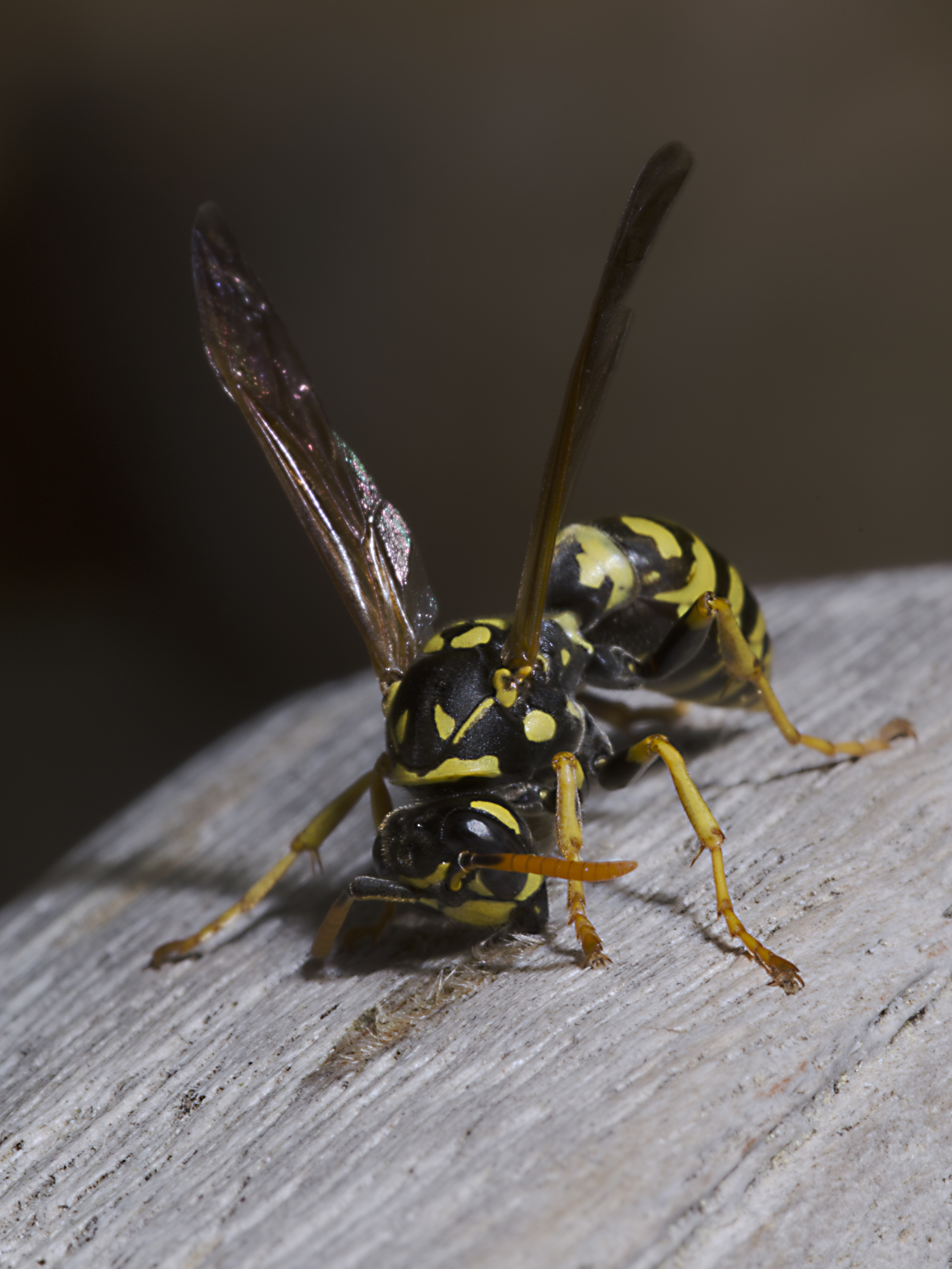
Rasping wood fibers for nest-building

In the first 12 days of the nesting period, 75% of foundresses leave their original nests, and travel to around three nests before settling permanently, choosing the nest with the highest reproductive payoff. Foundresses choose nest sites by weighing the benefit of an expanded colony with the cost of predation risk. Multiple-foundress nests have a higher chance of survival compared to single-foundress nests, and in general, foundresses found nests with those with which they hibernate in the same aggregation.

=== Comb arrangement ===
The nest, consisting of a single comb, is the heart of the colony, where food is stored and the immature brood reared. It is also the central spatial reference where the majority of individuals spend their time. P. dominula does not occupy the comb in random distribution. Each wasp spends the majority of its time on the comb in a relatively small area, around 12% of the comb. This small use of space is the norm, regardless of the number of wasps on the nest. However, this area could occasionally cover up to 50% of the comb. Dominant females occupy a smaller area than do subordinate foundresses and workers. Superimposition rates are low, which suggests that wasps limit each other's spaces. Workers prefer to overlap areas with other workers, while foundresses prefer to overlap areas with other foundresses. Around 70% of workers are active and occupy a small area of the comb, while the rest do not have particular fidelity areas and spend most of their time away from the nest or remaining motionless behind the nest. Alpha females are affected by cell content, resting more frequently on capped cells and avoiding empty ones.

=== Cooperation ===
Cooperation provides survival benefits; multiple-foundress groups are more likely to survive to produce offspring than are single-foundress groups, and individual foundresses in multiple-foundress colonies are less likely to disappear before worker emergence than foundresses nesting alone. Therefore, association provides significant productivity and survival advantages for cooperating foundresses. Cooperation provides survival benefits only if individual foundresses on a multiple-foundress nest have a greater chance of survival than individuals that found nests alone or the foundress' contribution to the nest is preserved even after she leaves.

=== Queen loss ===
Queen loss is a crisis for a colony of social insects, which may cause increased aggression and work inefficiencies. Also, if the colony can produce a new queen, it could be slow to produce eggs. After queen loss, replacement queens do not mate in the 12 days following queen removal and few had mature eggs in their ovaries. After a month, most replacement queens develop ovaries and mate. Nest growth decreases with colonies that lose their queen, which can be expected if increased dominance behavior interfered with other essential behaviors or if the new queen is not competent at egg laying. Among queenless colonies of P. dominula, individuals demonstrated an increased level of chewing and climbing, but not of lunging and biting. These are all dominance behaviors. No difference of foraging behaviors occurs between colonies with and without queens. Subordinates are kept reproductively suppressed enough not to be a threat to the existing queen, as indicated by the high cost of queen replacement.

=== Nest adoption ===
Adoption is a result of three situations: when queens lose their nests and "make the best of a bad situation"; workers leave multiple-foundress nests; and subordinates employ a "sit-and-wait" strategy, waiting for nests to be abandoned. Nests are orphaned when the adult wasps die while taking care of their nest, leaving an immature brood. Orphaned nests allow a new wasp to gain status as queen without a fight. Females that adopt nests are less cooperative and expend less energy than those that found nests. Spring foundresses sometimes found colonies alone, form associations with others, take over established conspecific colonies, or even adopt abandoned nests. Females would adopt an abandoned nest if they lost their nest due to predation or other damage or if they waited to adopt an orphaned nest rather than found their own. Females engaging in the "sit-and-wait" reproductive strategy adopted the most mature nest rather than the nest with an increased probability of containing kin (from the same population). Females prioritize the quality of the nest over rescuing possible kin from another abandoned nest. Females demonstrate a preference for mature nests and nests with a large proportion of fourth- and fifth-instar larvae. When a female adopts an orphaned nest, she destroys the existing eggs and larvae, but allows older larvae and pupae to complete development. Adopting a nest maximizes the potential of possessing a mature preworker phase colony without expending excessive energy during the nest founding period or cooperating in the construction of the nest.

Once a nest is established, it may be used by multiple generations and in multiple seasons. Nests abandoned during the hibernation cycle are almost always repopulated the following spring. With each succession, the nest continues to grow in size. A few have been recorded at 8 inches in diameter. Multiple nests may be located in the same area within inches of each other.

=== Mating ===
P. dominula wasps have a lek-based mating system. Males compete intensely for dominant positions on the lek, while females are scrupulous when choosing their mates. Males form aggregations on the uppermost portions of structures such as fences, walls, roof peaks, and trees. Males often fight with other males in mid-air or on the structure. Males that lose will fly away from the lek. Females fly through leks or perch near lekking areas to observe males before making choices on mates. Females use the highly conspicuous abdominal spots on males, which are highly variable in size and shape, to aid in mate choice. Males with smaller, more elliptically shaped spots are more dominant over other males and preferred by females compared to males that have larger, more irregularly shaped spots.

Social insect males are often seen as mating machines, with an undiscriminating eagerness to mate. However, males encounter costs of unsuccessful mating in terms of energy investment. Therefore, P. dominula males are able to recognize female castes and preferentially choose reproductive females to workers, regardless of health or age. Males are able to differentiate castes through perceiving differences in chemical signals and physiological status. While males are able to discriminate between castes, they are not capable of discriminating between health, as males showed a strong preference for gynes, both healthy and parasite-castrated, compared to workers, because males distinguish females by CHC profiles, which are very similar between healthy and unhealthy gynes. Therefore, males are not able to evaluate the true reproductive potential of the females they encounter.

In response to the males being sexually aggressive, females of P. dominula demonstrate ways to weed out the low-quality males. Females are typically larger and more dominant than males, so females exert strong choice by rejecting males. One way they reject males is to express aggressive behaviors such as biting, darting, or stinging to stop the male from copulating with her. Another way is to remain still while the male mounts, but move her abdomen to prevent the male's genitalia entering her body. Females are also known to mate with multiple males, especially with non-nest mates. They fly over to different males' nests to assess the best-quality males and generally copulate with the resident males. That males are resident males often implies that they are large, sexually active and aggressive – providing better protection for her and the brood.

=== Transitive reasoning ===
P. dominula is the first invertebrate to show the ability to perform the mental operation of transitive inference. This is the ability to deduce that if Tom is taller than Alice and Alice is taller than Pat, Tom must be taller than Pat. This mental ability is common in vertebrates.

P. dominula were trained on five pairs in a series one of which (marked _{s}) shocked the insect while the other did not. The series of shocks ran thus: A_{s}—B, B_{s}—C, C_{s}—D, D_{s}—E. When tested against a pair they were not trained on, B_{s}—D, the P. dominula wasps chose D more often than chance, indicating that they had used transitive inference to organize the four pairs into a series, and used that to choose when faced with a pair not seen before.

== Parasitoidism, parasitism and social parasitism ==
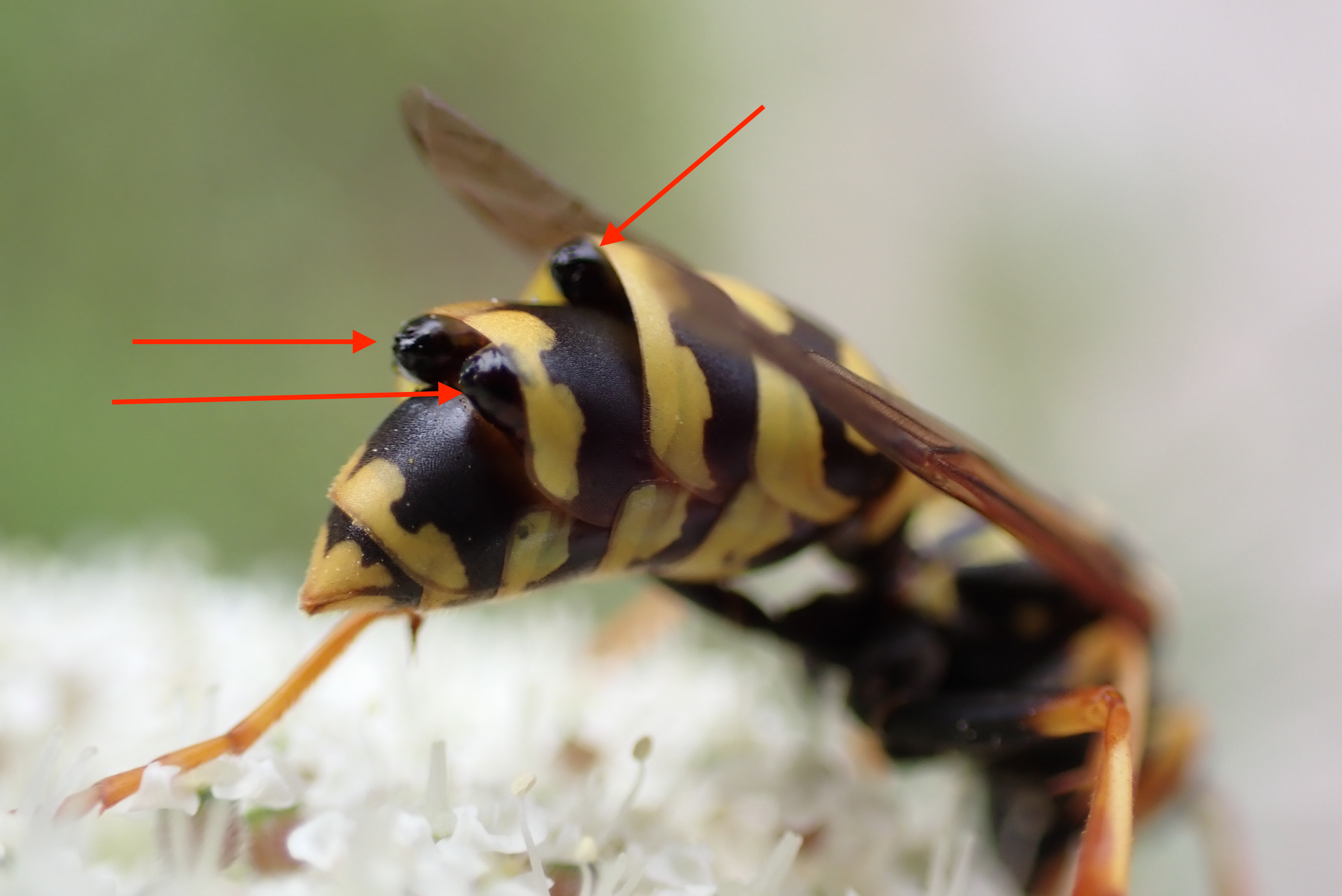
Three Xenos vesparum parasites in P. dominula

P. dominula nests have resident brood parasitoids, including Lepidoptera larvae, Hymenoptera and Diptera. The first well-documented case of parasitoidism of the North American invasive population was reported in 2010. P. dominula are also often infected by Xenos vesparum, a permanent entomophagous endoparasite. The ectoparasites of this wasp are the mites Sphexicozela connivens and Leptus sp. P. dominula is also parasitized by Polistes semenovi and Polistes austroccidentalis, permanent workerless social parasites. P. semenovi females take over the host colony by eliminating dominant foundresses and matching their cuticular profiles. P. semenovi females gain these cuticular profiles by intensively grooming and licking the host foundresses and workers, or from the nest material which is covered in cuticular hydrocarbons essential for nest mate recognition. This chemical mimicry allows foreign P. semenovi females to gain acceptance from the host insects.

== Relationship to humans ==
=== Medical significance ===
In southern Europe P. dominula stings are a frequent cause of allergic reactions.

=== Damage to fruits of agricultural plants ===
P. dominula, when fed with carbohydrates, often damages juicy fruits with a high sugar content. In Eastern Europe, damage has been reported on apricots, plums, cherry plums, cherries, apples, pears, watermelons, and melons. In western Colorado P. dominula is a common pest in fruit orchards and can be very damaging to ripening grapes, sweet cherries, and other thin-fleshed stone fruits.

=== Control of phytophagous pests ===
When feeding on protein, P. dominula significantly reduces the number of leaf-eating pests, such as butterfly and sawflies larvae, making this species a promising biocontrol agent.

=== Pollination of agricultural plants ===
Morphological and ethological adaptations of P. dominula to efficient pollination of flowering plants have been revealed. It is shown that the structure and location of the pubescence of the wasp body favors the collection and transfer of pollen grains, and the features of feeding behavior on flowers minimize their loss. In the Donbas region of Eastern Europe, this wasp has been recorded pollinating the flowers of seven species of food and essential oil crops. Among these, it is the primary pollinator of fennel.

=== Industrial use of salivary proteins ===
Salivary proteins harvested from the nest of P. dominula have been cloned for use as a waterproof coating used in the manufacture of biodegradable drones. The lightweight material used to construct the body of the UAV consists of fungal mycelium covered with bacterial cellulose sheets. The cellulose is then waterproofed with a coating of the cloned protein, which is a component of the saliva used by the wasps to waterproof their paper nests.
