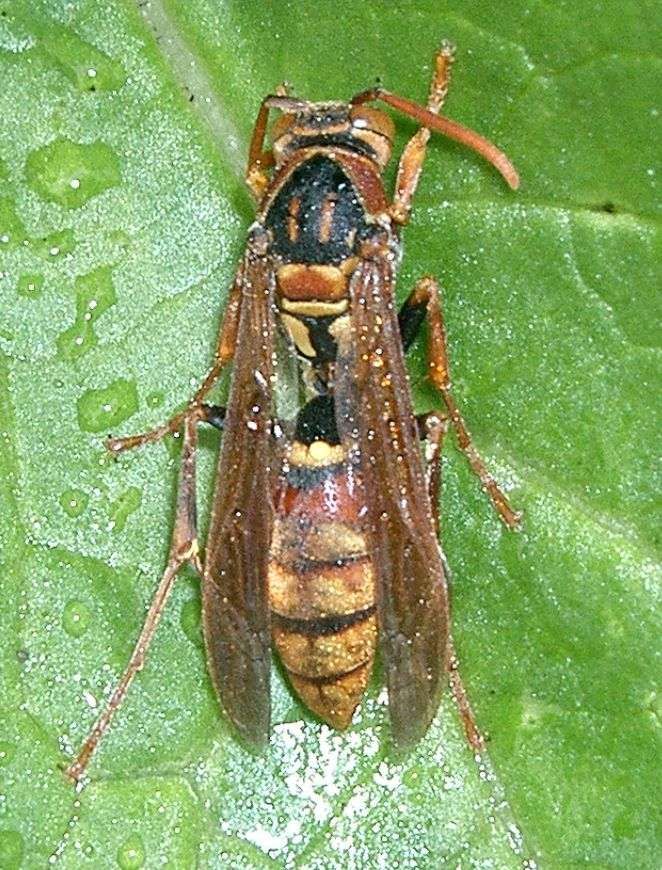

Scientific classification
- Kingdom: Animalia
- Phylum: Arthropoda
- Clade: Pancrustacea
- Class: Insecta
- Order: Hymenoptera
- Family: Vespidae
- Subfamily: Polistinae
- Tribe: Polistini
- Genus: Polistes
- Species: P. japonicus

Binomial name
- Polistes japonicus Saussure, 1858

Synonyms
- Polistes erythrocerus Cameron, 1900; Polistes hengchunensis Kuo, 1987; Polistes shekouensis Kuo, 1987

= Polistes japonicus =

Species of wasp

Polistes japonicus is a eusocial paper wasp found in Japan. It was first described by Henri Louis Frédéric de Saussure in 1858. It is closely related to Polistes formosanus. This species lives in small colonies with few workers and a foundress queen. Nests of these wasps are sometimes used as a traditional medicine in Korea, China, and Japan.

== Taxonomy and phylogeny ==
Polistes japonicus is a member of the tribe Polistini within the paper wasp subfamily, Polistinae. They are in the subgenus Polistella within Polistes. A close relative within this subgenus is P. snelleni. They are primitively eusocial wasps.

== Description and identification ==
P. japonicus has a pronotum with sparse, minor punctures. In males, the anterior margin of the clypeus is rounded. The scutellum disc is slightly convex. The abdomen is yellow with brown and/or black bands. The wings are darkened with a brownish tint. There are no morphological differences between workers and new reproductive females in this species. There is a sexual dimorphism in P. japonicus, with males being larger than females. This is suggested to be a result of local mate competition between the males.

=== Nests ===
The nests are paper nests, which are generally small, open faced, 1-tiered nests. These nests can be found in lowland areas, and they usually have 40–80 cells.

== Distribution and habitat ==
Although the first described population of P. japonicus was found in Japan (japonicus, "of Japan") subsequently these wasps have been found to be rare in Japan, where researchers have been able to study them in central Japan. They have also been found in Vietnam, India, China, Mongolia, and Korea.

== Colony cycle ==
=== Colony initiation ===
The colony is initiated around May, after an overwintering foundress founds a nest. The workers emerge soon after, often in June and July. After this, males emerge and then new reproductive females emerge in August. These females that appear later in August are non-foragers, and thus are new reproductive females. There are usually around 10 workers, with a maximum of 50 reproductive adults per colony. If a foundress is to disappear or die, the next top-ranked worker will inherit the colony and lay eggs.

=== Colony decline ===
P. japonicus lives in temperate regions, so these wasps do not all survive through the winter. This results in smaller colonies because many do not have a long life span as a result of winter. Queen-destined females of P. japonicus have been found to overwinter in wood or human constructions. They have also been found in the walls of the leaf scroll made by the larvae of the banana skipper before pupation. This is a novel overwintering site as this banana pest was introduced into Okinawa as recently as 1971, possibly from Vietnam.

== Behavior ==
=== Dominance hierarchy ===
Throughout colony development, the foundress remains the highest-ranked member. Workers rarely display dominance behaviors to the foundress. The dominance hierarchy in Polistes japonicus is determined not by body size but by worker age, similarly to the related species Polistes instabilis. Depending on the development of the colony, either young workers or older workers are higher in the dominance hierarchy. In the first-brood period of these wasps, older workers are more likely to be ranked higher in the dominance hierarchy, but the opposite is true in the mixed brood period. The dominance hierarchy promotes efficient foraging during the first-brood period and in the mixed brood period it functions to determine which workers might have a chance to produce offspring of their own. In moving up the dominance hierarchy, it is more common for the younger workers to do this because they are less physically and physiologically damaged as a result of working for a shorter period of time. Young workers could also seem more successful as a result of the older workers being uninterested due to their age and the unlikely possibility of them reproducing. Rank is important in this species because this social dominance hierarchy functions as a mechanism to select who will supersede the foundress and be able to reproduce.

=== Aggressive behaviors ===
The dominance hierarchy is maintained by aggressive encounters in which individuals exhibit dominant behaviors such as mounting, biting or rushing. Rushing is when an individual rushes at another and pushes against it with its mandibles. A wasp will approach another more quickly when rushing than when biting. Biting is when an individual bites a part of the other wasp with its mandible. Rushing is less common than biting. Other dominance behaviors that are commonly found in other species that are not observed in this species include dominant worker buzzing its wings, stinging the subordinate and rising above the subordinate on its legs. These aggressive behaviors maintain the social dominance hierarchy and determine the reproduction sequence among workers.

=== Division of labor ===
The foundress is the queen who establishes the colony. She will perform tasks inside and outside the nest before the workers emerge, and after that she will rarely perform tasks outside the nest. Due to the physically and physiologically demanding foraging done by the foundress in the period before the emergence of males, it is common for foundresses to lose their vigor in the field and become lazy. The foundress exclusively lays the eggs. Workers that are socially dominant and high up in the hierarchy are expected to be lazy in order to save energy for future possibility of reproduction. If workers refrain from foraging for food they can obtain better fitness by maintaining their physical and physiological vitality. Subordinates forage for food while dominants refrain from foraging in the event of the need to replace the foundress. When the foundress has a high vigor, all workers use cooperative rearing to increase the total number of reproductive progeny and will perform both extranidal and intranidal tasks, or tasks both outside and inside the nest.

=== Communication ===
Abdominal wagging is a common form of communication among these wasps. A foundress will perform abdominal wagging while walking from one cell to another checking the cells, and will often rub the ventral side of the posterior part of her abdomen on cell walls while walking from cell to cell. Abdominal wagging is a silent form of communication. A foundress performs abdominal wagging for a longer time than those superseding her. In fact, some workers never perform abdominal wagging. If the foundress disappears, the highest ranked-worker will increase their abdominal wagging, but still wag less than the foundress. The foundresses in some P. japonicus populations also exhibit lateral vibrations. The foundress moves her abdomen faster in lateral vibration than in abdominal vibration. In lateral vibration, the foundress remains steady on the lower part of the outer walls of the comb of the nest. She points her head up and vibrates her abdomen laterally. A sound is produced as she rubs the anterior to middle part of the ventral side of the wall. It is also possible that workers may be able to detect the pheromones that are released when the foundress is wagging and rubs her abdominal tip on the cell walls, which is another form of communication.

== Kin selection ==
=== Worker queen conflict ===
A large component of worker-queen conflict is worker oviposition. Usually, in many paper wasps that are primitively eusocial, the oviposition of workers is suppressed by the aggressive supremacy by a queen. In some cases, including that of P. japonicus, worker oviposition can be suppressed due to the queen's producing males before female reproductives. The foundress performs almost all of the ovipositions, and it has been found that those eggs not laid by the foundress disappear, possibly as a result of being eaten by a worker or the foundress. This is known as oophagy.

=== Sex allocation ===
The investment sex ratio for P. japonicus is 4.61:1 (reproductive females to males). This ratio is expected to be female-biased when workers triumph in the conflict with queens, and unbiased when a foundress queen succeeds. If all males originate from eggs of workers, then the investment ratios are expected to be unbiased. If the workers are triumphant, then they can select for their offspring and differentially feed males and females. In the case of P. japonicus, protandrous production accounts for the strongly female-biased investment ration. Protandrous production is when reproductive females are created after males. It has been suggested that as a result of sexual selection, protandry forms a preadaptation that gives the queen more power to control the production of males and the sex ratio. The control of the sex ratio is not from the competition and actions of the workers while they rear the brood, but rather due to the ability of the foundress queen to control the percentage of eggs that she lays and fertilizes.

== Diet ==
P. japonicus have been found to feed mainly on caterpillars found on plant leaves. After the wasp egg hatches, adult workers hunt caterpillars for them to feed on during their larva stage. When these wasps are studied in a lab, they feed on lepidopteran larvae, adult cicada thoraxes, and honeybee pupae or larvae.

== Human importance ==
Traditional folk medicines have widely utilized nest materials, honey and larvae of social wasps in both sole and crude forms. In China, Korea, and Japan, the nests of P. japonicus have been used as a traditional medicine. Reportedly, the crude extracts can provide a variety of pharmacological activities, which include anti-inflammatory, anti-viral, anti-microbial, anti-tumor, and anesthetic properties.
