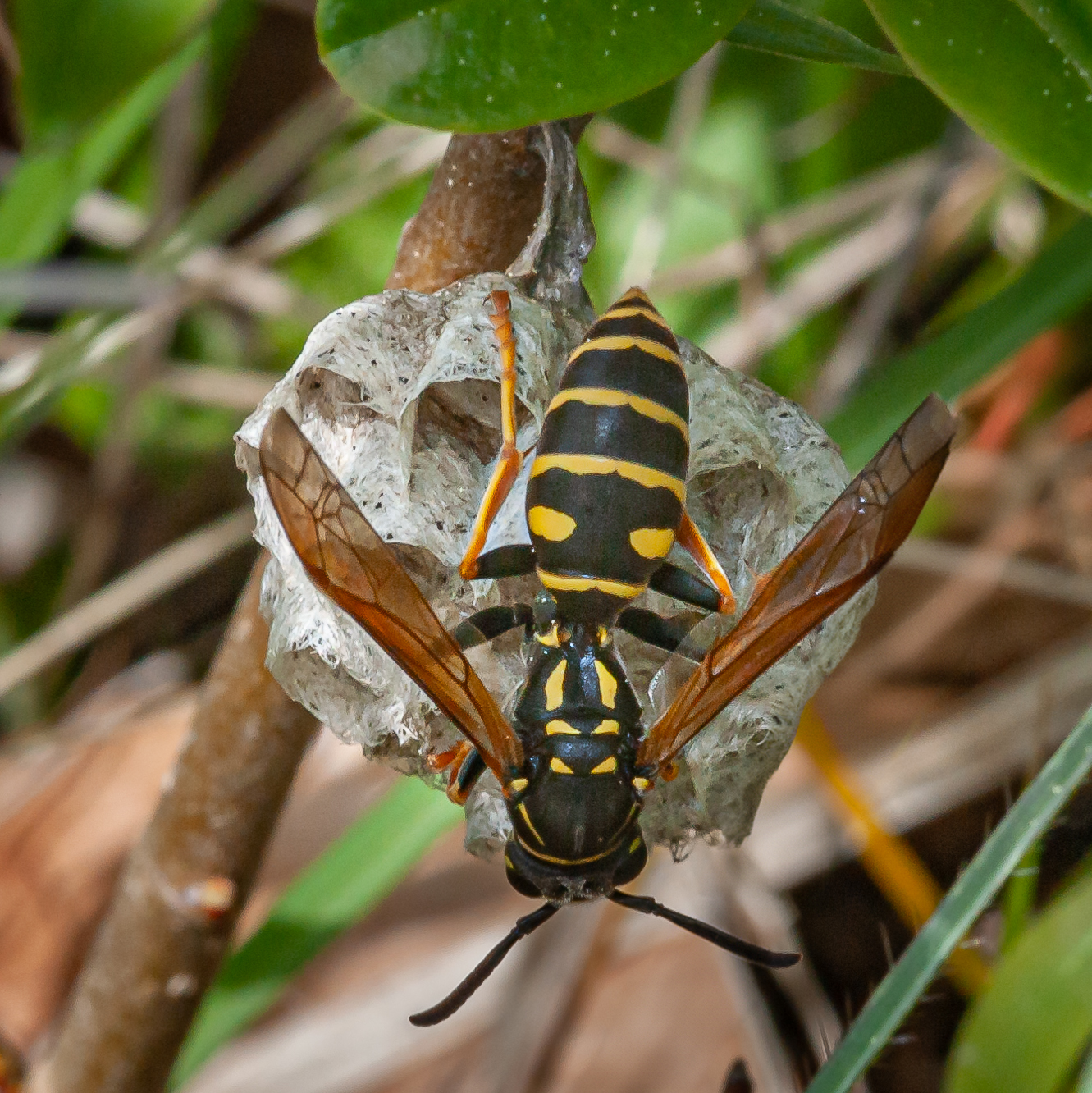
- Female

Scientific classification
- Kingdom: Animalia
- Phylum: Arthropoda
- Clade: Pancrustacea
- Class: Insecta
- Order: Hymenoptera
- Family: Vespidae
- Subfamily: Polistinae
- Tribe: Polistini
- Genus: Polistes
- Species: P. biglumis

Binomial name
- Polistes biglumis (Linnaeus, 1758)

Synonyms
- Vespa biglumis; Polistes pamirensis; Polistes dubia Kohl, 1898; Vespa biglumis Linnaeus, 1758; Vespa rupestris Linnaeus, 1758

= Polistes biglumis =

Species of wasp

Polistes biglumis is a species of social wasp within Polistes, the most common genus of paper wasp. It is distinguished mainly by its tendency to reside in montane climates in meadows or alpine areas. Selection pressure from the wasp's environment has led to several idiosyncrasies of its behavior and lifecycle with respect to its relative species in the genus Polistes. It alone among paper wasps is often polyandrous. In addition, it has a truncated nesting season that gives rise to unique competitive dynamics among females of the species. P. biglumis wasps use an odor-based recognition system that is the basis for all wasp-to-wasp interaction of the species. The wasp's lifecycle is highly intertwined with that of Polistes atrimandibularis, an obligate social parasite wasp that frequently invades the combs of P. biglumis wasps.

== Taxonomy and phylogeny ==
Swedish zoologist Carl Linnaeus described Polistes biglumis in 1758. Its species name biglumis is a Latin phrase meaning "two husks." While no common name for the wasp exists in English, it is referred to as berg Feldwespe in German (meaning "mountain field wasp"). P. biglumis has been studied alongside Polistes snelleni and Polistes chinensis for comparison. P. biglumis was originally classified as a hornet in the genus Vespa, but was reassigned to the genus Polistes, which is the largest genus of paper wasps in the family Vespidae.

This species resides mainly in mountainous zones in Southern Europe, and it is the only paper wasp that inhabits a mountainous clime. Due to its divergence from the more common temperate climes of its genus, it has developed several distinctions from other paper wasps that arise mainly from selective pressure due to the severe climate it commonly experiences. The climate shortens the nesting season of P. biglumis to around four months. In addition, the nests exhibit darker coloration, which allows them to absorb more heat from the sun. Workers are also often nonexistent in some populations of P. biglumis, which demonstrates a large dichotomy from other social wasps, whose most commonly seen specimens are the workers. Finally, because of the reduced nesting season and parasitism by other wasps, P. biglumis has developed nesting strategies that are both distinct from other paper wasps and variable among conspecific populations.

== Subspecies ==
- P. b. alpium Blüthgen, 1957
- P. b. biglumis (Linnaeus, 1758)
- P. b. bimaculatus (Geoffroy, 1785)

== Description and identification ==
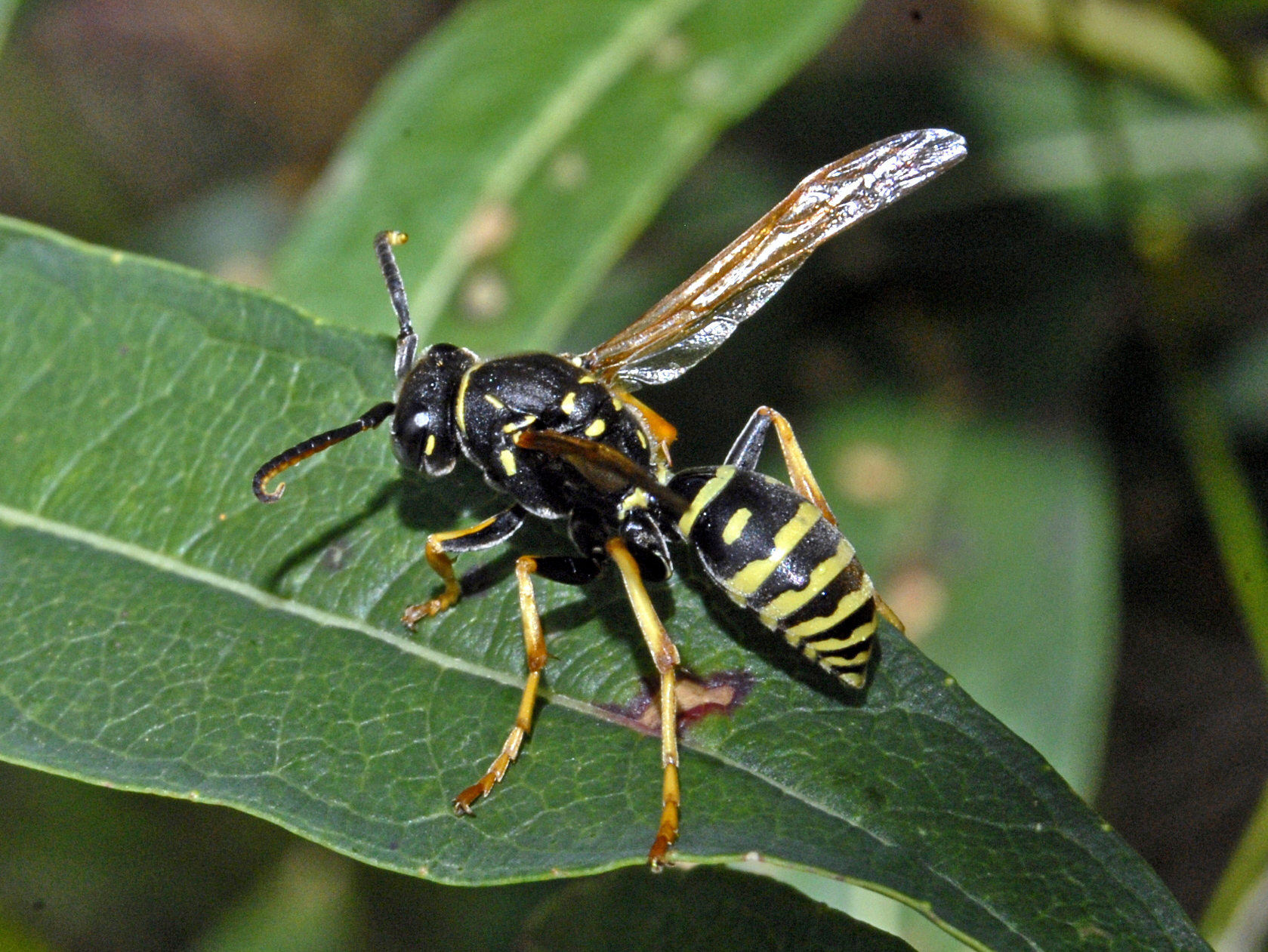
Polistes biglumis bimaculatus

Polistes biglumis can reach a length of up to 16 mm (0.63 in) (queen), 14 mm (0.55 in) (workers), 15 mm (0.59 in) (males). It is a larger species of wasp in comparison to its relatives in Polistes. It also exhibits darker coloration compared to other paper wasps; it has a black petiole for both sexes. The females exhibit black abdomens, as well, with rare yellow spots. Males, however, have largely yellow abdomens. Adult wasps can be distinguished from the young because they are darkly colored and can fly, whereas young wasps have paler stripes and are flightless.

Workers and queens do not exhibit morphological differences, but they can be distinguished physically by the abundance of their fat layers and behaviorally through their relative foraging efforts. Queens have more abundant fat layers and are also significantly less likely to participate in foraging for the nest. In addition, the color of the fat layers is distinct for workers versus queens; the workers exhibited yellow fat layers while the queens exhibited milky fat layers.

The nests of P. biglumis are circular or elliptical in shape and are hung vertically by one pedicel. They are largely produced by the foundress during the phases of egg and larval production. The peripheral cells are generally uninhabited. Nests are more likely to be closer to the ground versus other Polistes wasps because the ground offers thermal inertia and shelter from strong winds. The nest material is also key to nestmate recognition because nest surfaces are impregnated with the epicuticular hydrocarbons that establish the framework by which the individuals discriminate between other wasps.

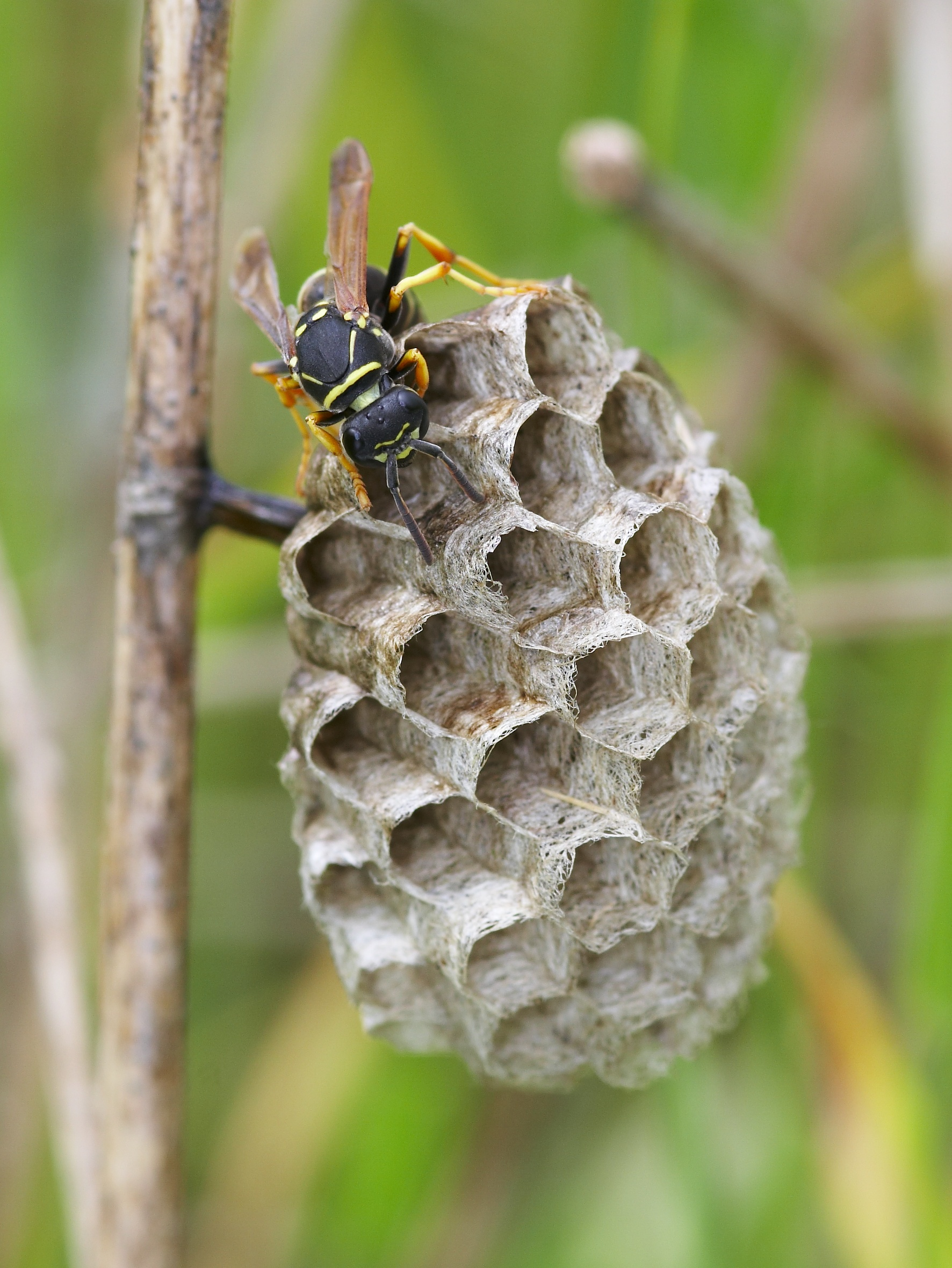
A close-up of the nest of a P. biglumis wasp: The nest material is characteristic of all paper wasps in the genus Polistes.

== Distribution and habitat ==
This species resides mainly in mountainous zones in Southern Europe, especially in Italy and France, including the relatively cooler climate of the Alps and the relatively warmer climate of the Apennines (although neither climate is temperate, making P. biglumis anomalous among Polistes species). Montgenèvre, a commune located in the French Cottian Alps, has been used extensively as a region to study the behavior of the wasp in its natural environment. In addition, P. biglumis can be found extending into Uzbekistan, Sweden, Germany, and Austria. While a few ecologists attribute the name P. biglumis to a wasp species inhabiting Okkaido, Japan, as well, the Japanese species is an undescribed species more closely related to P. nimpha than to the predominantly European P. biglumis described here. The species found in Japan has been closely studied alongside Polistes snelleni, another common Japanese paper wasp. The wasps of this species generally nest on the sides of rocks in meadows in the mountains or in alpine areas consisting of Pinus sylvestris and Larix decidua. The colonies inhabiting these nests are both small and rare, as the colony cycle for the wasp is truncated to only four months. On average, the colonies consist of about 30 individuals.

== Colony cycle ==
P. biglumis colonies are always founded by a single foundress wasp. New colonies become active in late May or early June each year, and the colony cycle terminates in September. Half of all P. biglumis nests fail during the pre-emergence stage, and due to the limited colony cycle, foundresses cannot start a new nest for the season. The egg stage of the P. biglumis wasp is around 2 weeks, and the male offspring are produced before female offspring in a sequential fashion. The rate of appearance of future queens, however, is affected by environmental factors in the region; early female offspring in cold areas with high parasitism have fatter, gyne-like bodies and less foraging effort than do female offspring in warm areas with low parasitism. Both the climate and the parasite prevalence affect the first female offspring's abundance of fat bodies independently of one another, but only climate affects the first female offspring's foraging effort. Parasitism has no effect on late female offspring, but climate still affects the fat layers of their bodies. P. biglumis may have been selected for suppressed worker production in the first brood, the only brood not destroyed by parasites, so that new queens would survive to produce new colonies. The colony cycle is characterized by a pre-emergence period that lasts from foundation by the single gyne of the colony to the emergence of the first new worker, and a postemergence period, from the emergence of the new worker to the end of the cycle (as an annual species, this marks the end of the colony). At the end of a season, the future queen females of the colony overwinter to reproduce in the spring.

== Behavior ==
=== Communication ===
==== Recognition ====
Polistes biglumis wasps exhibit a homogeneous odor that is both species- and colony-specific, and it is used by individuals to recognize nestmates. This system of recognition uses epicuticular-saturated hydrocarbons. The queen produces the odor specific epicuticular hydrocarbons and transfers them to the nest paper. Wasps learn to recognize nestmates by the nest paper odor, which serves as a template for recognizing any wasp and determining whether or not to act aggressively toward it. Although epicuticular hydrocarbons cover the adults and larvae of Polistes biglumis, as well as their nest surfaces, newly emerged P. biglumis wasps are accepted in foreign colonies of the same species, whereas adult non-nestmates are met with violent aggression, usually until the invading wasp is killed. The distinction between aggression toward foreign newly emerged versus adult wasps could arise from a low level of epicuticular hydrocarbons developed in newly emerged wasps with respect to adult wasps. This low level is tantamount to a weakening of the signal. Similarly, a dead adult wasp that has been stripped of its epicuticular hydrocarbon layer elicits no reaction in a foreign nest.

==== Egg discrimination ====
P. biglumis females have also developed a method for discriminating between their own and foreign conspecific eggs that will become queens; they tend to eat foreign wasp eggs. Cues for distinguishing the eggs are located on the eggs themselves. This discrimination is a useful tactic both for foundresses that are in conflict with usurpers or joiners, and for usurpers and joiners themselves. No such system of recognition exists for eggs that develop into workers.

=== Mating behavior ===
P. biglumis males typically return to sunlit landmarks in their patrol flights repetitiously. Males adopt certain tiny territories, usually small stones or scrubs within a larger mating region that they patrol, defend against intruders, and mark with scent. Both the suitability of the microclimate of the territory adopted by the male and the conspicuousness of the territory against the terrain affect the mate-locating efficacy of the species. Males attempt to copulate with females resting on their habitual perches in their discrete territories within a larger mating aggregation, characteristic of a lek mating system. Landmark mating in this system is advantageous for the promotion of outbreeding. Each lek is composed of related males that capture contiguous territories. One-third of all P. biglumis females mate with multiple male partners, all of whom aree related. P. biglumis females' polyandrous activity make them unique among all other paper wasps.

=== Dominance hierarchy ===
Since a large set of nests will fail during the nesting season, foundresses constrained by the limited nesting season are forced to attempt female usurpation, where females take over conspecific nests. Thus, nests often have multiple unrelated females. The nests are either fully usurped, where the original female leaves; joined, where the original female remains; or both usurped and joined by other female wasps. Usurpers and joiners are not related to the original nest owner, but instead were random wasps from the overall population, which differs from other Polistes wasp joiners that always join with relatives. Usurping and joining are both inferior strategies to founding a new nest and are only fractionally successful, so these strategies are only chosen after nest failure when the breeding female is not a resident of any nest and is searching for alternative reproductive opportunities. In each case of serial female nesting, the original nest owner no longer has control of the nest. In addition, the newcomer destroys part of the original brood. All new breeding is by the intruder, and kin-selected benefit via raising the new brood is eliminated for the original female's emerging brood.

== Kin selection ==
=== Sex ratio ===
The average sex ratio of P. biglumis is female biased; however, the specific sex ratio varies from brood to brood from virtually all male to all female. Furthermore, the sex ratios vary temporally, as well, and the sex ratios are biased toward females more toward the end of the pre-emergence period. The presence of multiple females also affects the sex ratios, and single matrilineal nests were more male biased than were nests that underwent serial breeding by multiple females. Because foundresses produce a large number of male offspring early in the season, and nest founders produce similar sex ratios to begin with, a section of the male offspring of the original foundress is culled by usurpers and joiners.

=== Relatedness ===
P. biglumis has a haplodiploid sex determination system. All males among a male brood exhibit the relatedness of full brothers, indicating that they are haploid and generally produced by one female. Females, though, are diploid. Sex ratio analysis indicates that the female producing all of the male workers was the original nest founder.

== Predation ==
Nest predation on the wasp is minimal throughout its nesting season; however, when it does occur, it is mainly perpetrated by birds. Nevertheless, nest predation by vertebrates reaches its peak during the pre-emergence period when the nest is empty except for the foundress and is, as a result, undefended. Furthermore, such predation is a major contribution to nest failure. In these cases, often the nest is preyed upon, but the foundress survives, which leads to the creation of usurpers and joiners. Unlike with other Polistes species, ants do not often attack the nests of P. biglumis. Accordingly, P. biglumis releases a very reduced amount of ant repellant substance on to the pedicels of the nests. In most Polistes species, this substance is secreted via abdominal glands on pedicels to prevent ant invasion of the comb.

== Parasitism ==
Polistes atrimandibularis is a rare, obligate parasite that permanently invades the nest of the P. biglumis colonies. Its prevalence is highest in relatively cooler P. biglumis habitats in the Alps and is scarcer in their warmer habitats in the Apennines. The parasite wasp queen invades the nest of the foundress host wasp during the pre-emergence phase when the nest is empty except for the foundress. The parasite wasp destroys all of the host eggs, and then represses the foundress's egg-laying capacity, cutting her productivity in half. As a result, often only the first of the P. biglumis wasp broods survive, namely the brood that emerged early and escaped destruction by the parasite queen.

=== Efficacy ===
The parasite enters the host nest peacefully and submits to the attacks of the foundress, but over time, the parasite queen begins to dominate the host queen. The parasite queen co-opts the host workers and the host queen to care for her brood by altering their processes of nestmate recognition. Parasite queens also help care for the larvae toward the end of the colony cycle. She enters other local colonies of the host species to steal their larvae and pupae. She uses the pupae and larvae of the foreign colony P. biglumis to feed her own larvae in the parasitized nest. Intrusion and survival of the parasite wasp in the host foundress's nest is based largely on its ability to manipulate various components of the recognition system used by the host wasp.

=== Recognition ===
==== Epicuticular hydrocarbons ====
Parasite queens have levels of epicuticular hydrocarbons key to recognition that are one-third to one-fourth the levels in host wasps, which facilitate a weaker signal that allows them to insinuate themselves into host colonies. As time progresses, the parasite queen can camouflage her odor as a host wasp; at the point of emergence for the workers, the parasite queen is indistinguishable from the host queen. The adult parasitic offspring have no such mechanism for deception and they have unsaturated epicuticular hydrocarbons specific to their species that do not occur in the host species. However, the different odors of parasite and host species do not affect the acceptance by the host species workers of the parasite brood in parasitized nests. As a result, parasitized colonies do not have a homogeneous odor because parasite offspring have a different odor from hosts.

==== Parasitic emulation ====
The survival of the parasite offspring relies on their queen to alter the nest paper from which the new host workers learn nestmate recognition. The parasite wasp impregnates the nest paper with unsaturated, parasite-species hydrocarbons so that the emerging host workers learn to recognize both host and parasite broods as nestmates. As a result, newly emerged parasite wasp females are only accepted in P. biglumis colonies that have already been parasitized. In nonparasitized colonies, they receive highly aggressive responses from host wasps. Thus, the host wasps in parasitized colonies learn a recognition odor template that is more inclusive than the one used by wasps of nonparasitized colonies. This expanded template leads to a far greater error rate in nestmate recognition for the host wasp. The parasitized nest hosts demonstrate an impairment in discrimination, and are much more likely to permit even non-nestmate conspecific individuals. They are also more likely to reject nestmates erroneously.
