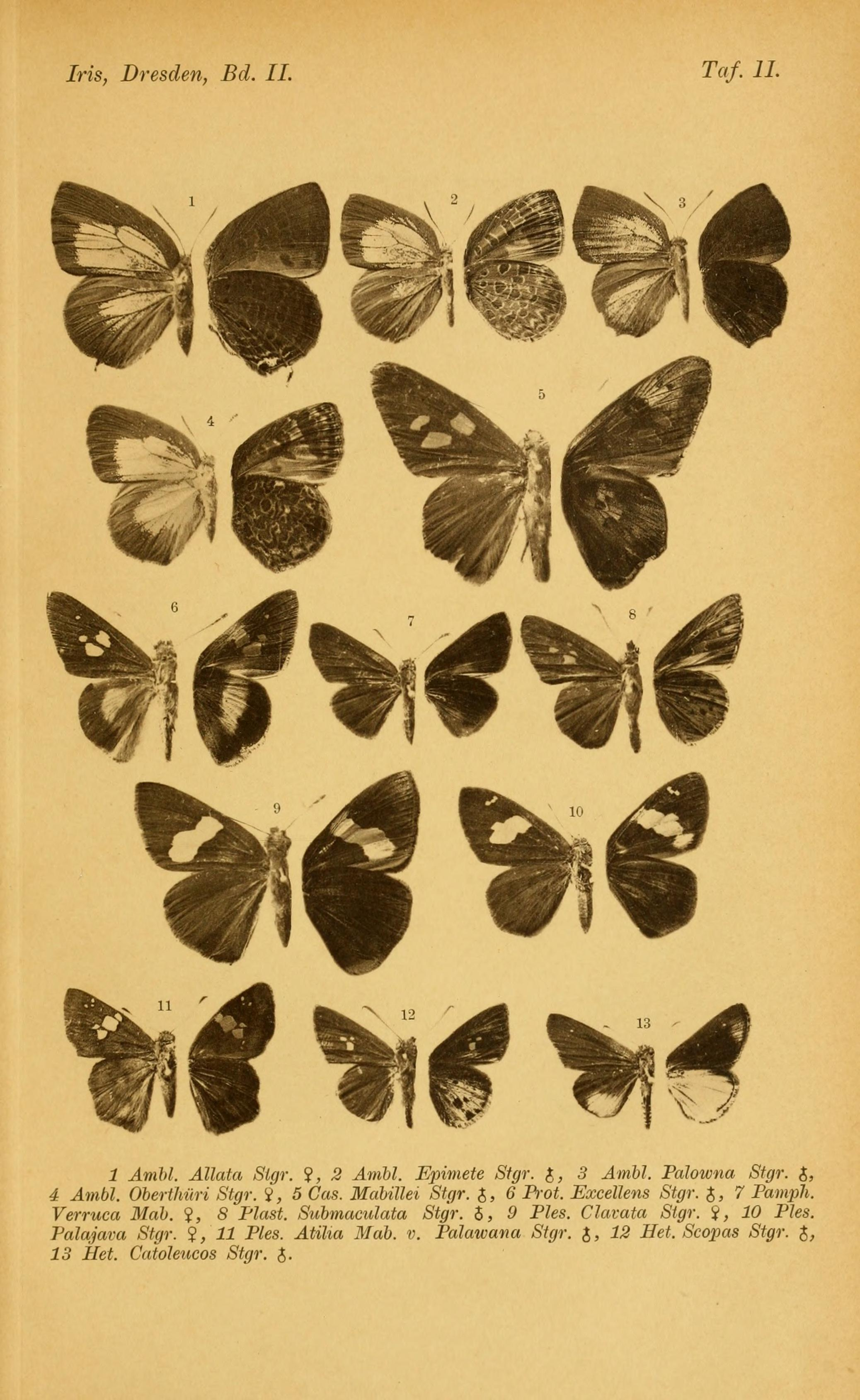
- Figure 5

Scientific classification
- Kingdom: Animalia
- Phylum: Arthropoda
- Class: Insecta
- Order: Lepidoptera
- Family: Hesperiidae
- Genus: Erionota
- Species: E. sybirita

Binomial name
- Erionota sybirita (Hewitson, 1876)

Synonyms
- Hesperia sybirita Hewitson, 1876; Erionota mabillei Staudinger, 1889

= Erionota sybirita =

Species of butterfly

Erionota sybirita is a species of Indomalayan butterfly of the family Hesperiidae. It is found in Malaysia, Burma, Thailand, Borneo and Palawan.The variegated under surface of the hindwing is traversed by 2 rows of greenish-brown oblong spots.
