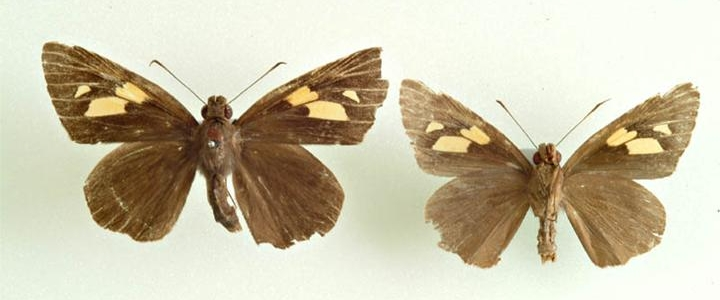

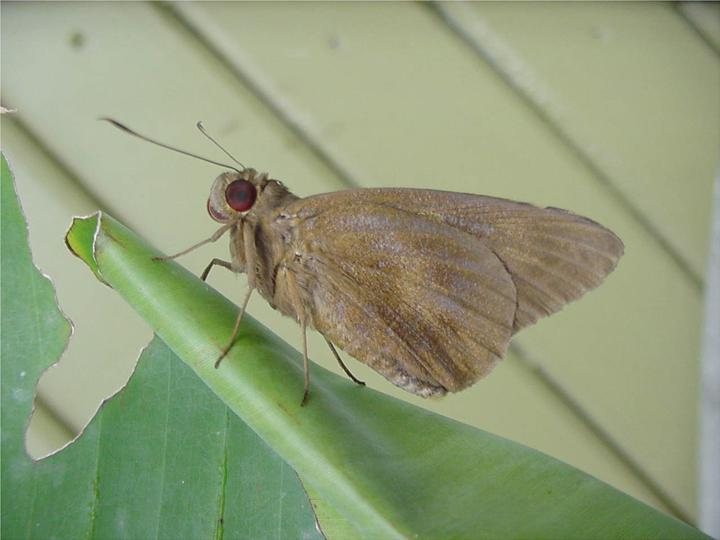

Scientific classification
- Kingdom: Animalia
- Phylum: Arthropoda
- Class: Insecta
- Order: Lepidoptera
- Family: Hesperiidae
- Genus: Erionota
- Species: E. thrax

Binomial name
- Erionota thrax (Linnaeus, 1767)

Synonyms
- Papilio thrax Linnaeus, 1767

= Erionota thrax =

Palm redeye

Species of butterfly

Erionota thrax, the palm redeye or the banana skipper, is a species of butterfly belonging to the family Hesperiidae. It is found from India, through south-eastern Asia to Papua New Guinea. In the north it is found up to southern China. It is an introduced species on various Pacific islands, including the Solomon Islands and Hawaii. It has also been recorded from Mauritius.

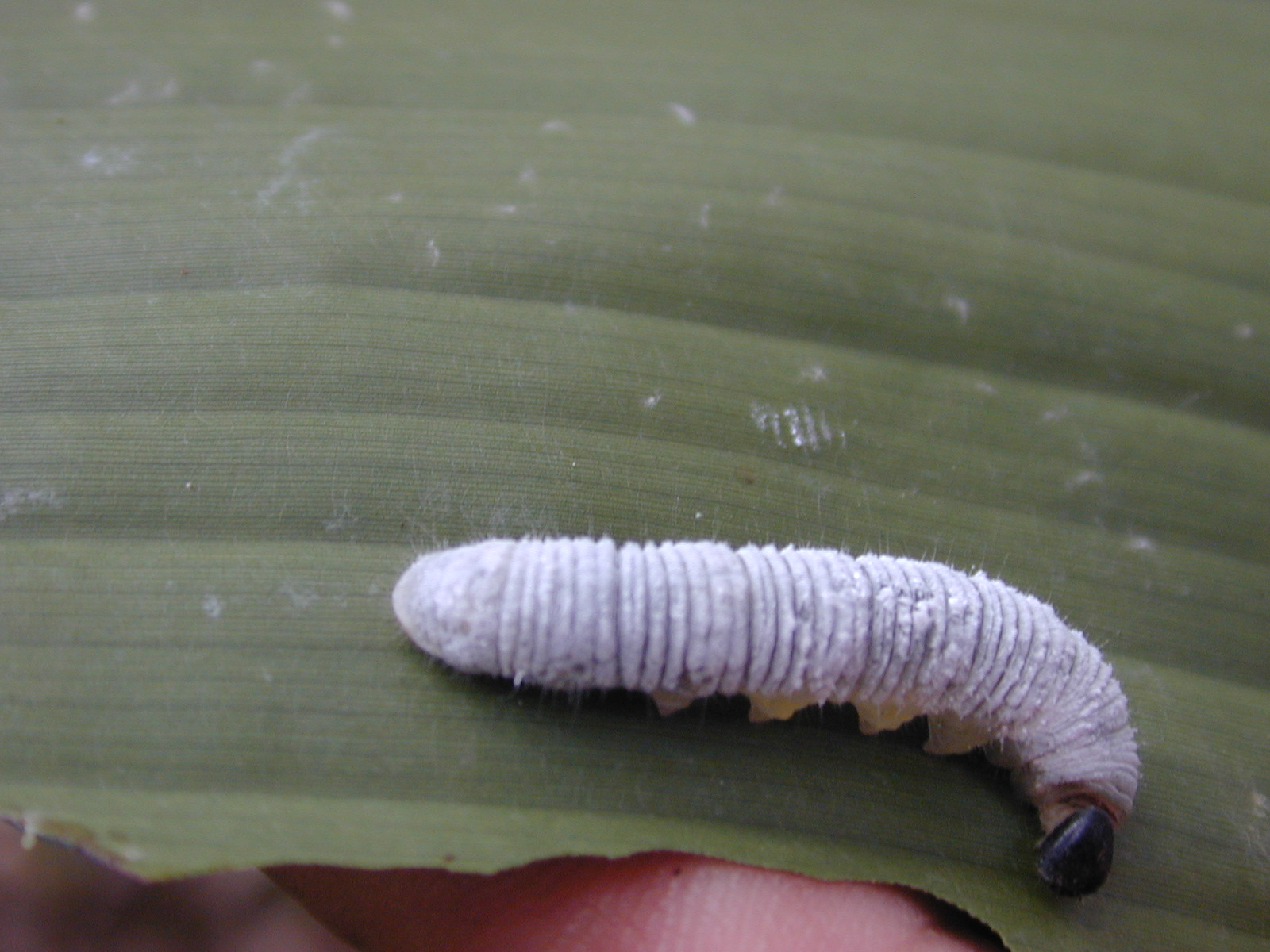
Erionota thrax caterpillar on a banana leaf (Musa sp.), Maui, Hawaii

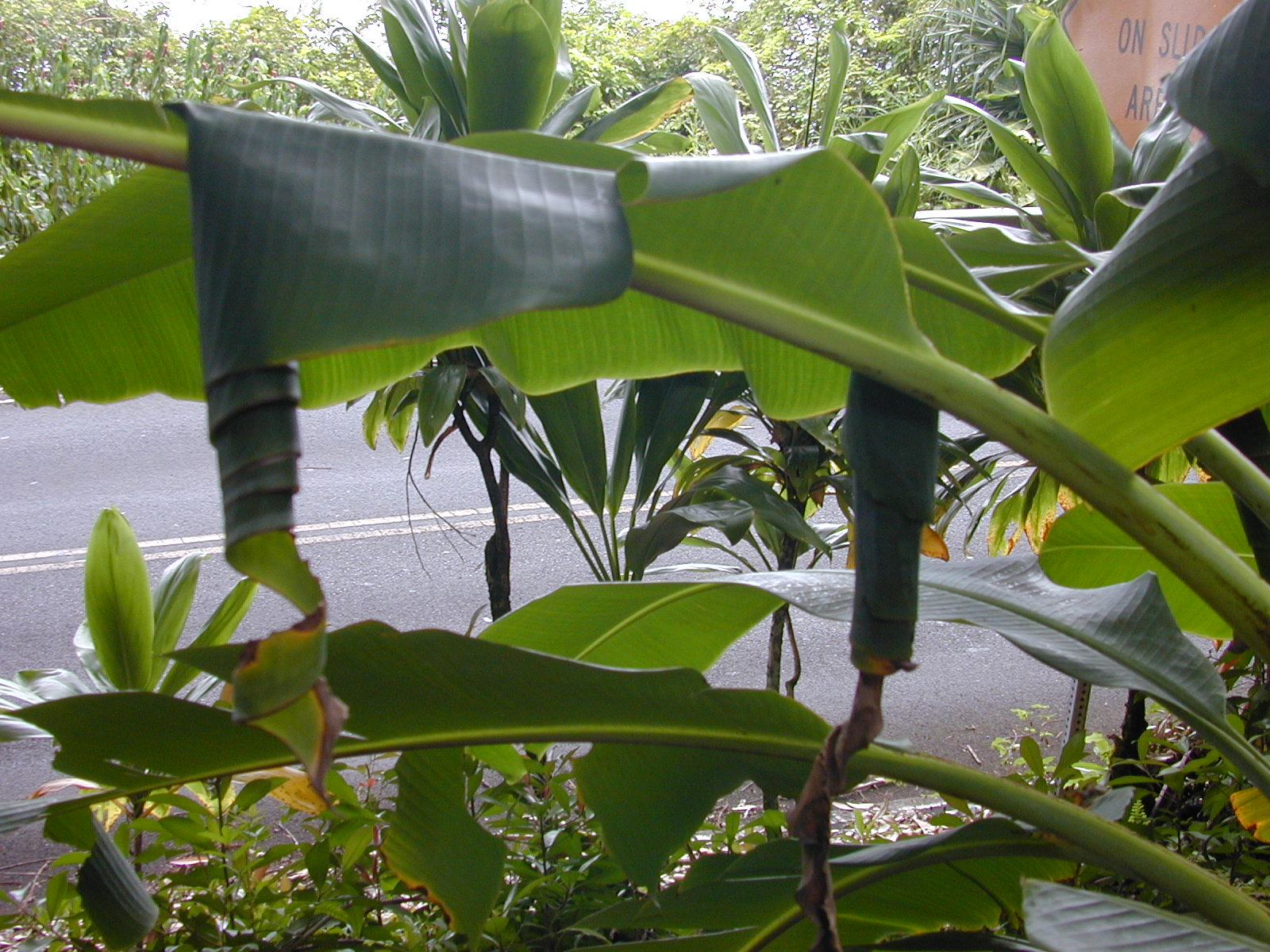
Rolled banana leaf caused by Erionota thrax

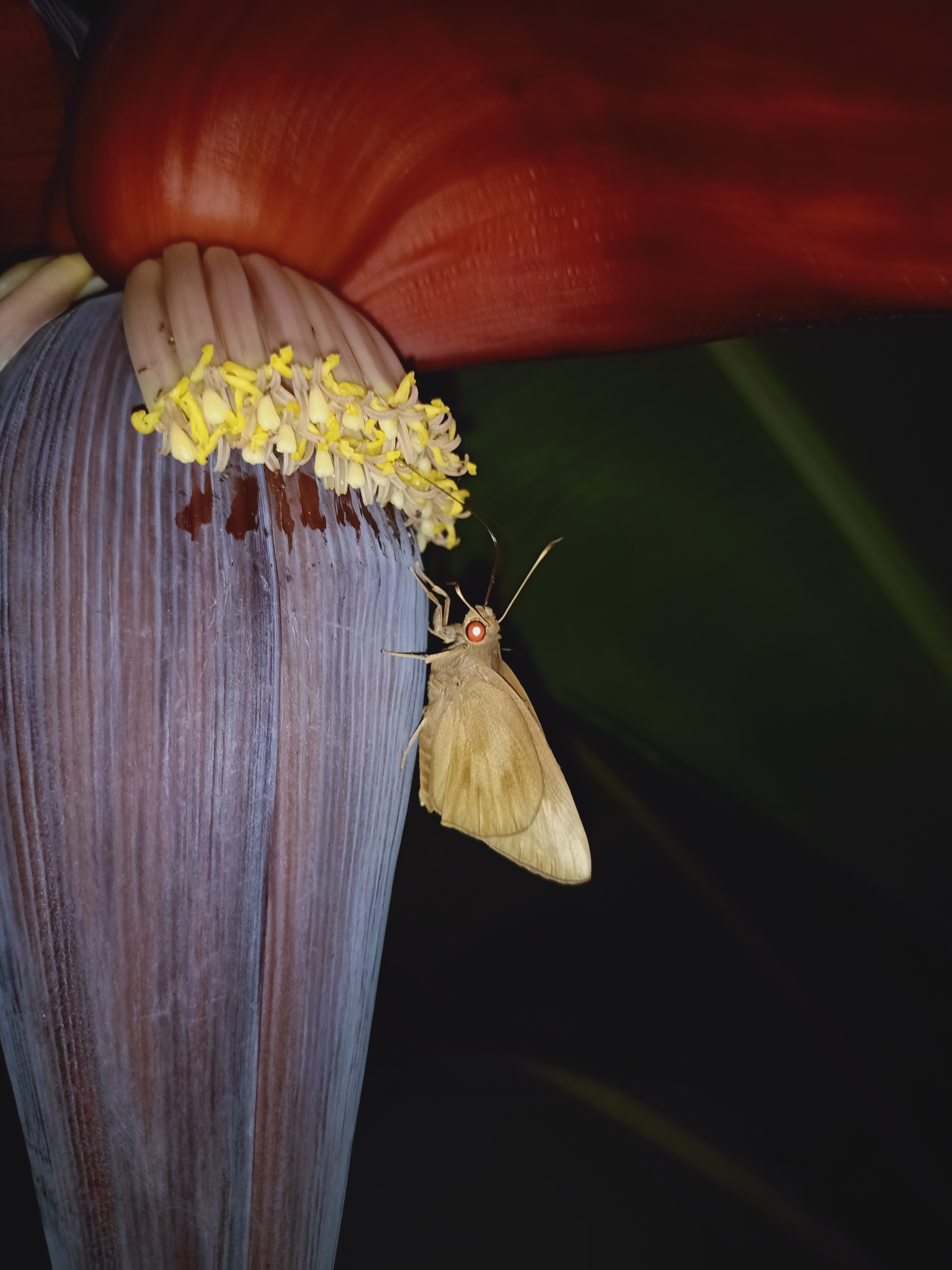
Erionota thrax on a banana flowerbud

The wingspan is 70–77 mm. There are multiple generations per year.

The larvae feed on the leaves of Musa species, especially Musa textilis. It has also been recorded on Cocos nucifera and other palm species.

The rolls in banana leaves that E. thrax larvae create when feeding have been used as overwintering shelters for wasp species Polistes japonicus in Okinawa, Japan.

== Description ==
Male and female. Wings above chocolate-brown; anterior wings with three discal pale ochraceous spots, situate one crossing cell, another beneath cell and between the two lower median nervules, and the third and smallest between the first and second median nervules; posterior wings with the fringe greyish-ochraceous. Wings beneath paler than above; posterior wings with a discal, rounded, macular, darker fascia. Body and legs more or less concolorous with wings.

— Edward Yerbury Watson

== Subspecies ==
- Erionota thrax thrax (Indonesia)
- Erionota thrax mindana Evans, 1941 (southern and central Philippines)
- Erionota thrax hasdrubal Fruhstorfer, 1910 (northern Moluccas)
- Erionota thrax alexandra De Long et Treadaway, 1993 (Luzon, northern Philippines)
