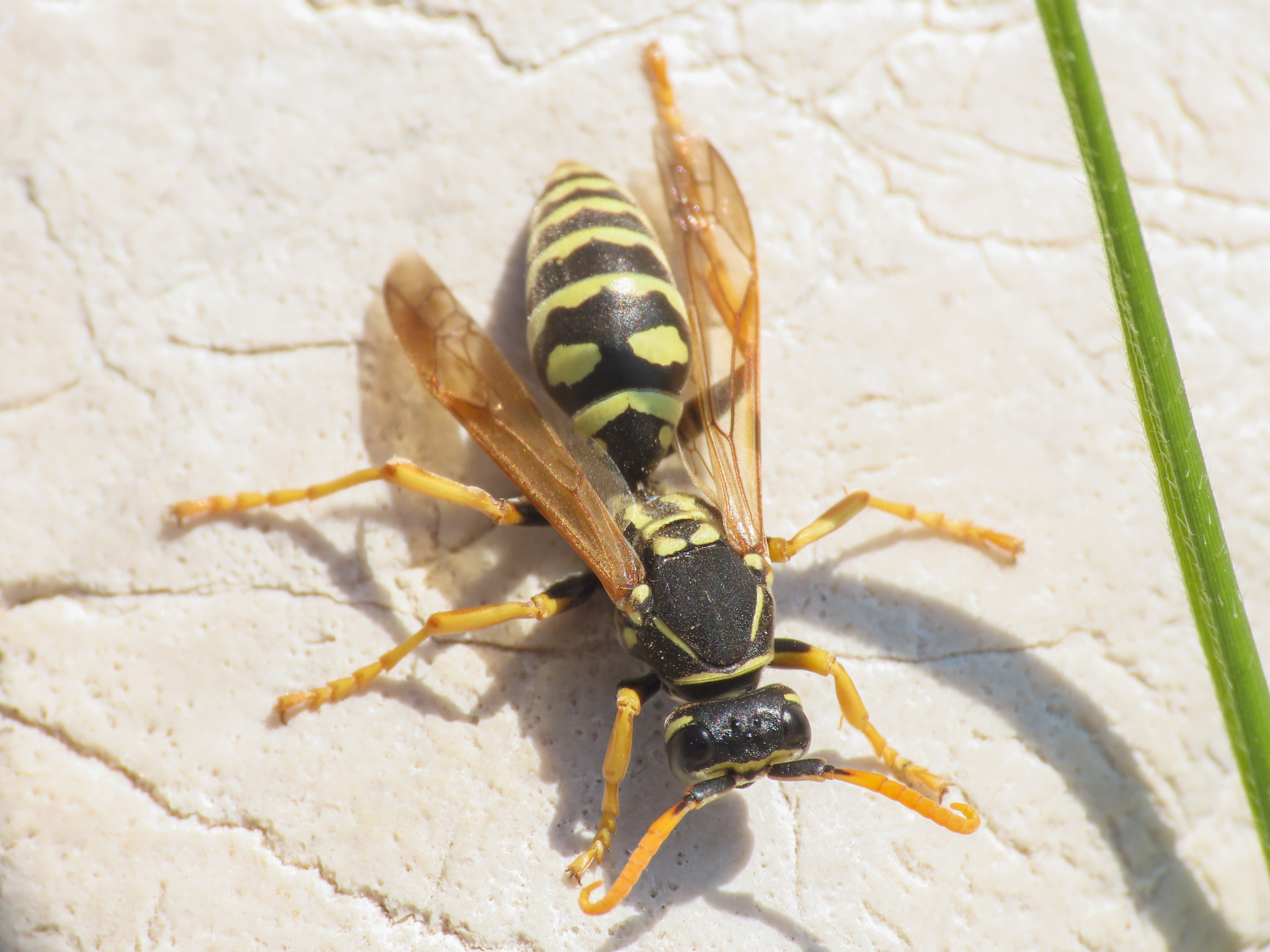

Scientific classification
- Domain: Eukaryota
- Kingdom: Animalia
- Phylum: Arthropoda
- Class: Insecta
- Order: Hymenoptera
- Family: Vespidae
- Subfamily: Polistinae
- Tribe: Polistini
- Genus: Polistes
- Species: P. atrimandibularis

Binomial name
- Polistes atrimandibularis Zimmermann, 1930

= Polistes atrimandibularis =

Species of wasp

Polistes atrimandibularis is one of four obligate social parasites among the Polistes wasps found in Europe. Of the four social paper wasp parasite species known, it is the smallest. It parasitizes multiple species such as P. dominula, P. nimpha, P. associus, P. gallicus, and P. biglumis. Females of P. atrimandibularis are unable to build a nest or produce workers, and therefore rely entirely on the host colony.

== Taxonomy and phylogeny ==
P. atrimandibularis is in the subfamily Polistinae (paper wasps). It is closely related to the other three obligate social parasites: P. austroccidentalis, P. maroccanus, and P. semenowi. These four Polistes inquiline species are more closely related to P. nimpha and P. dominula rather than to P. gallicus and P. biglumis.

== Description and identification ==
P. atrimandibularis is the smallest of the social Polistes parasites. The size of the host's species brood cells determines P. atrimandibularis size, with the smaller P. atrimandibularis emerging from the nests of P. gallicus and P. associus. Likewise, the larger P. atrimandibularis emerge from the nests of P. dominula instead. This paper wasp has enlarged mandibles, used as weapons to injure hosts that resist parasite intrusion. They also have an enlarged first femur and a longer posterior tibia that is useful for when they must maintain a dominant position within the host colony.

== Distribution and habitat ==
P. atrimandibularis is rare in Europe, found mainly around the Mediterranean and Caspian basin, but it ranges from south and south-central Europe to western Asia. They typically position themselves at higher elevations, although it is not unheard of to find colonies at lower elevations. Accordingly, one of the species that P. atrimandibularis parasitizes, P. biglumis, lives mainly in montane climates in Southern Europe. They do not possess the ability to build their own nests, so they must parasitize other wasps’ colonies.

== Colony cycle ==
Similar to the other Polistes social parasites, P. atrimandibularis usurps colonies in the late spring, which is roughly one month before the emergence of host workers. This allows the parasite sufficient time to reproduce and exploit the worker force. As soon as the usurper has successfully dominated the host's queen, it begins to lay its own eggs, and will remain in the host colony until the end of its life cycle. It is not until late summer that the newly emerged parasites migrate to the mountains to mate and then overwinter for several months under a thick blanket of snow and ice.

== Behavior ==
=== Mating ===
When P. atrimandibularis mate, males and females migrate to the tops of high mountains. At the top of the mountains, the males will occupy and aggressively defend their mating territories from male competitors. Once inseminated, females remain for overwintering for several months, under a thick blanket of snow and ice. To ensure that they arrive and usurp their host colonies at the correct time, P. atrimandibularis postpone the overwintering exit. These severe, high altitude climate conditions extend parasite diapause for about a month compared to the lowland host colonies, which allows the P. atrimandibularis to usurp colonies that are more developed. Since Polistes social parasites are very rare, these altitudinal migrations also give them an advantage. The migrations promote encounters between the two sexes and give more opportunities for matings between non-relatives.

=== Communication ===
Each colony has its own unique hydrocarbon chemical signature that allows P. atrimandibularis to distinguish nestmates from non-nestmates. When a female Polistes wasp first emerges, she is unaware of the colony's unique odor. However, after a few hours the female Polistes wasp will be able to recognize and identify the odor of the nest and create a template that it can refer to in the future. Being a social parasite, the queen has the ability to modify its own chemical signature along with the host's nest signature.

=== Reproductive suppression ===
Studies have shown that the presence of P. atrimandibularis lowers the reproductive capacity of the host queen and also inhibits the fertility of host workers. Host foundresses in colonies that were parasitized by P. atrimandibularis were found to have repressed ovarian development, with the female parasite becoming the sole female laying eggs in the colony. P. atrimandibularis is interesting in that the usurper cohabits with the host foundress for a long period of time. This suggests that the host foundress is needed in order to exert reproductive control on the host workers.

== Parasitism ==
While the other Polistes social parasites employ more aggressive tactics of usurping host colonies, P. atrimandibularis has a different approach. P. atrimandibularis uses a passive strategy to successfully invade and control a host nest. They do not have specific strategies for each of the host species they invade, instead, they utilize a generalized strategy for all of their invasions. This passive strategy consists of initial submission to frequent attacks of the host foundress, followed by the parasite gradually executing more and more dominant acts against the host foundress. Once the host foundress is subdued and the parasites take possession of the nest, they destroy the host's immature brood, eggs, and small larvae.

=== Secondary nests ===
Unlike the other Polistes social parasites, P. atrimandibularis simultaneously usurps surrounding host nests, in addition to invading the primary nest which are used solely for reproductive purposes. From these nests, the parasites take larvae and pupae to use as food for feeding their own larvae. By attacking and raiding secondary host nests, the parasites reduce host reproductive success and in return, provide great advantages to the primary nest. Despite P. atrimandibularis passive strategy for usurping colonies, they still maintain morphological fighting characteristics to aid them in their aggressive behavior while pillaging secondary nests.

=== Host impact ===
The host species that P. atrimandibularis decides to invade, affects the size of the newly emerging parasites. Female P. atrimandibularis that were raised by the larger P. dominula, were bigger than others raised by smaller species such as P. associus and P. gallicus. The bigger parasites were the ones that became the most successful usurpers, with only a few of the smaller parasites succeeding. The newly emerging P. atrimandibularis coming from P. dominula host colonies match the size of successful usurpers, suggesting that selection is acting on a population of parasites to increase average sizes and to favor the host P. dominula.

== Mimicry ==
In order to fully take control and integrate themselves into the host colony, the P. atrimandibularis queen needs to alter her distinct chemical order, as to not get rejected by the hosts. Before invading host colonies, the parasites have a species-specific epicuticular signature: unsaturated hydrocarbons (alkenes), which are absent in host species. After the invasion, these alkenes start decreasing in the parasite epicuticular profiles, and compounds abundant in the host chemical signature start increasing. Within one month, when the host workers emerge, the female P. atrimandibularis’s chemical signature perfectly mimics the host signature. At this point the parasites and host foundress are chemically indistinguishable. There have been cases where P. atrimandibularis was so successful in fooling the host species, that the hosts tended the parasite's larvae to maturity weeks after the parasites had left.

== Recognition ==
P. atrimandibularis queens need the one month before host workers emerge to reproduce and to modify the host's chemical signature. They do so by supplementing the paper nest surface with parasite specific compounds. By the time host workers emerge, they have already learned the modified colony chemical signature, containing both original and parasitic labels. Therefore, even when the parasites’ offspring emerge with their parasite-specific labels, and no colony-specific chemical labels, host workers will tolerate them.
