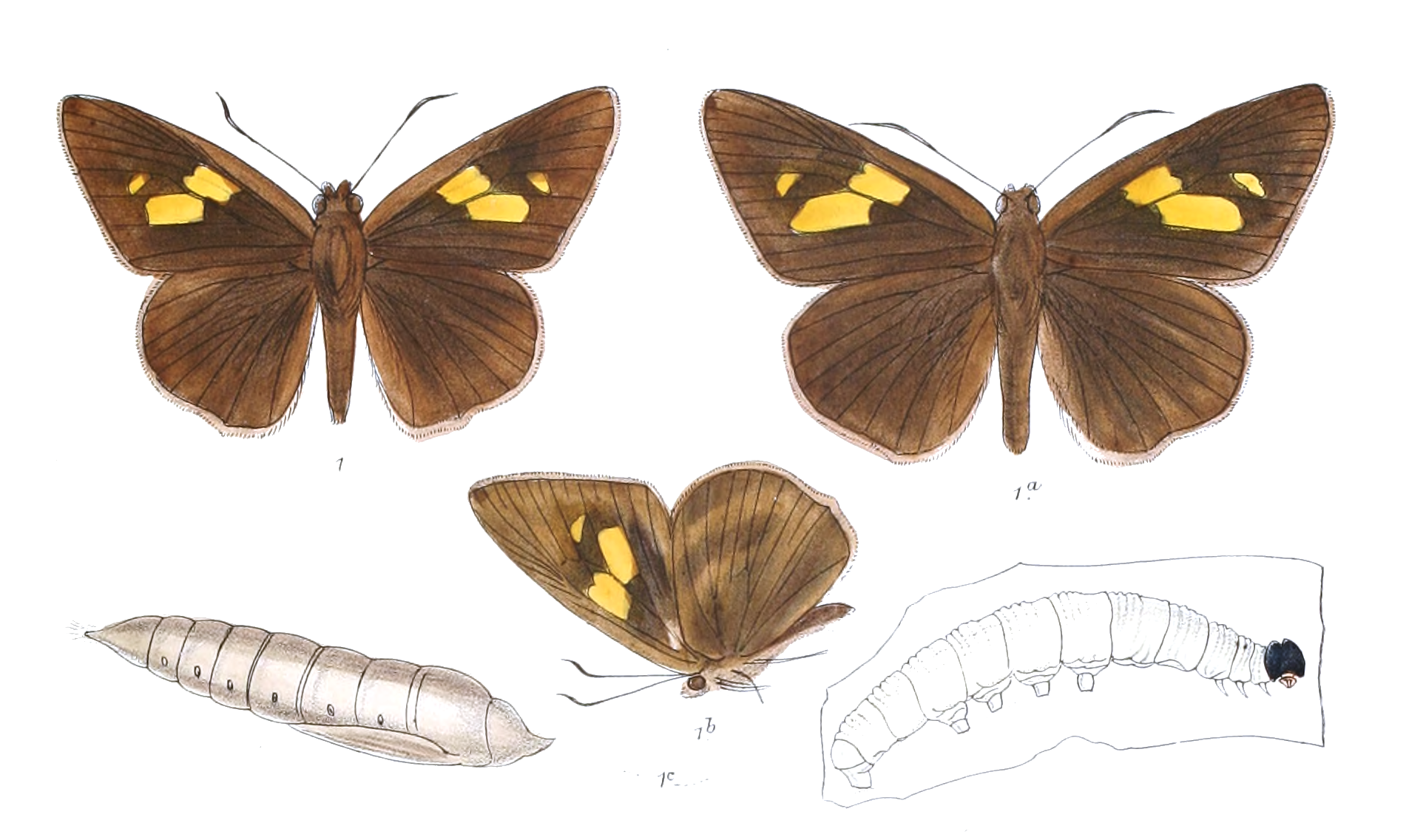
- Erionota thrax

Scientific classification
- Kingdom: Animalia
- Phylum: Arthropoda
- Class: Insecta
- Order: Lepidoptera
- Family: Hesperiidae
- Tribe: Erionotini
- Genus: Erionota; Mabille, 1878

= Erionota =

Genus of butterflies

Erionota is a genus of skippers in the family Hesperiidae. It is found in the Indomalayan realm

== Species ==
- Erionota acroleuca (Wood-Mason & de Nicéville, 1881) Vietnam
- Erionota grandis (Leech, 1890) West China
- Erionota harmachis (Hewitson, 1878) Sumatra
- Erionota hiraca (Moore, 1881) Sikkim to Burma, Thailand, North Vietnam, Malaya, Singapore, Borneo, Nias, Batoe, Sipora, Java, Bali, Lombok and (E. h. sakita (Ribbe, 1889)) Sulawesi, Bangka, Banggai, Sula Island
- Erionota hislopi Evans, 1956
- Erionota surprisa de Jong & Treadaway, 1993 Leyte (Philippines)
- Erionota sybirita (Hewitson, 1876)
- Erionota thrax (Linnaeus, 1767)
- Erionota tribus Evans, 1941 Celebes
- Erionota torus Evans, 1941

== Biology ==
The larvae feed on Gramineae, Palmae and Musaceae.
