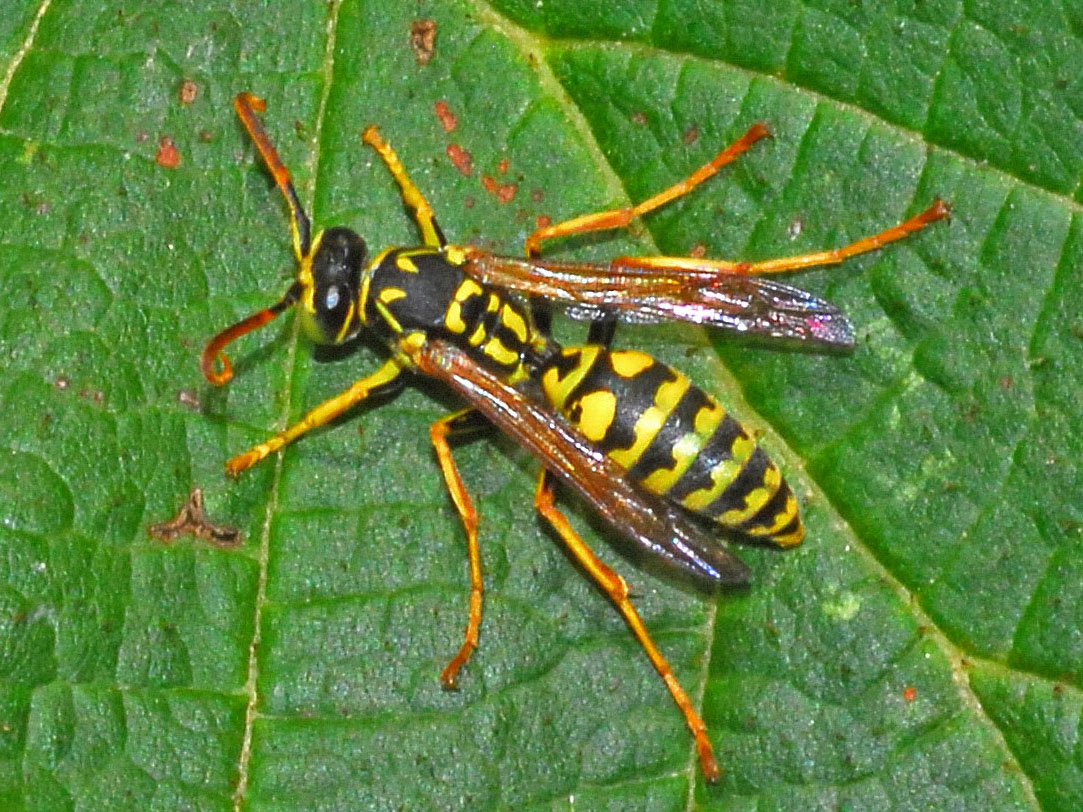
- Polistes associus. Male
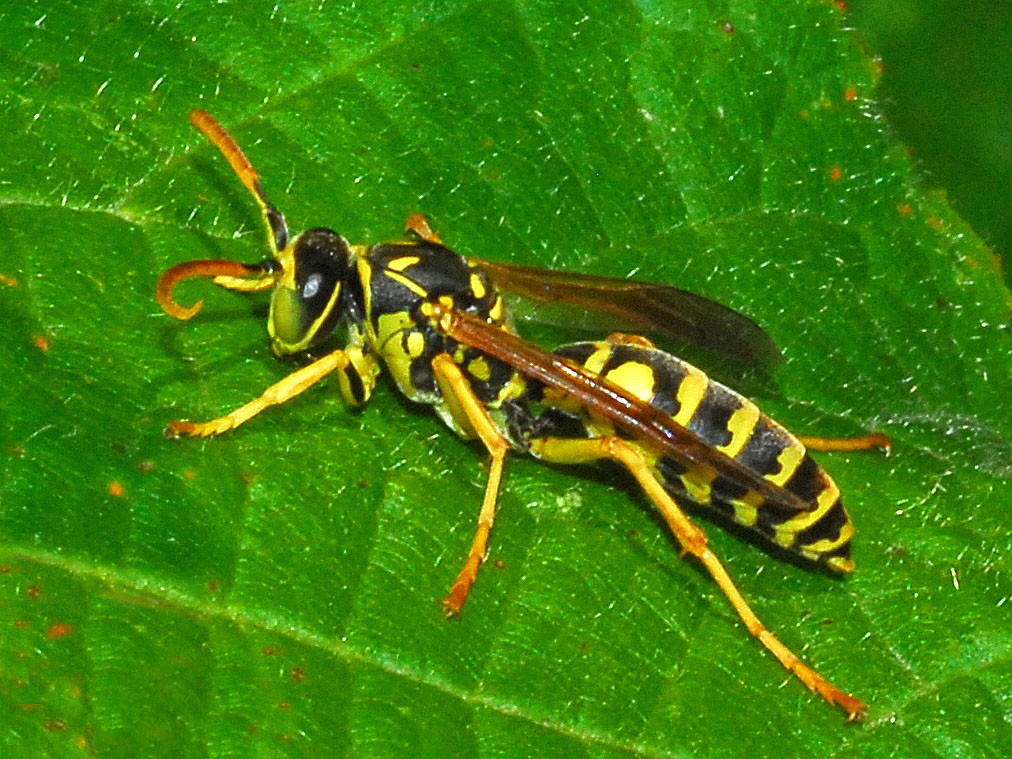
- Side view

Scientific classification
- Domain: Eukaryota
- Kingdom: Animalia
- Phylum: Arthropoda
- Class: Insecta
- Order: Hymenoptera
- Family: Vespidae
- Subfamily: Polistinae
- Genus: Polistes
- Species: P. associus

Binomial name
- Polistes associus Kohl, 1898

= Polistes associus =

Species of wasp

Polistes associus is a species of paper wasps belonging to the family Vespidae.

== Distribution ==
This species is present in central and southern Europe (Albania, Austria, Bulgaria, Croatia, European Turkey, France, Greece, Italy, Poland, Romania, Ukraine, Yugoslavia), in the Near East, and in the Oriental realm.

== Description ==
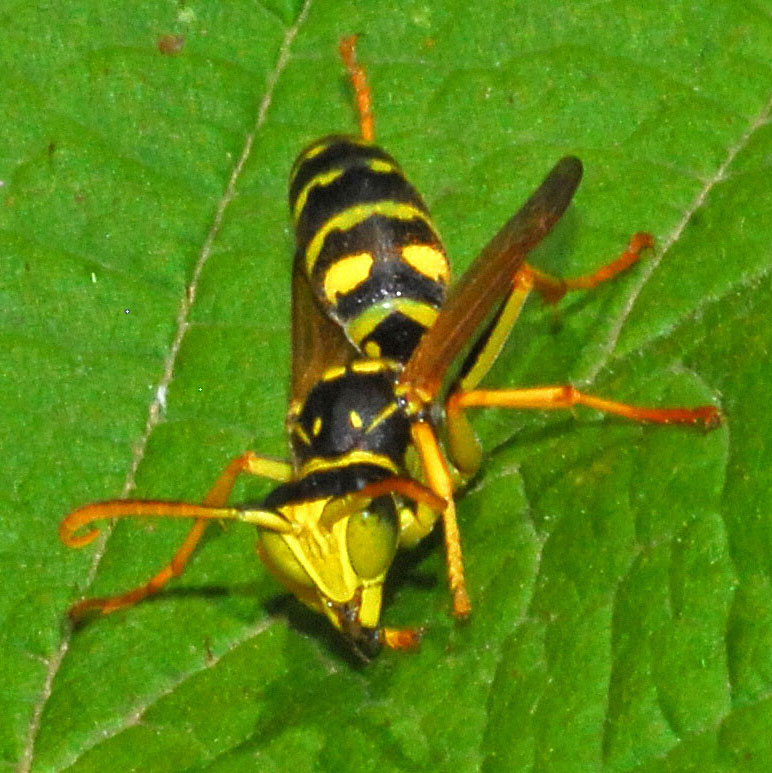
Polistes associus. Male, front view

Polistes associus can reach a body length of about 15–16 mm (0.59–0.63 in) in females, of about 11–14 mm (0.43–0.55 in) in workers.

These wasps are characterized by very light eyes, the ocelli arranged according to an equilateral triangle, with completely black mandibles and yellow lateral parts (genae) of the head. The dorsal surface of antennae is black in both sexes, with wide and deep longitudinal groove. Clypeus is uniformly yellow, markedly depressed, with a distinct longitudinal ridge and a black stripe.

The sixth sternit is black. The ventral part of the last abdominal segment is reddish-brown with an apical lighter spot.

The males are easily distinguishable by the combination of narrow temples and a markedly depressed clypeus. The dorsal length of the apical antennal segment is longer than in similar species.

This species is very similar to Polistes nimpha. For this reason the recognition of P. associus females may be problematic.

== Biology ==
These wasps parasitize other Polistes wasps of multiple species, especially Polistes atrimandibularis. and they are parasitized by Strepsiptera species.
