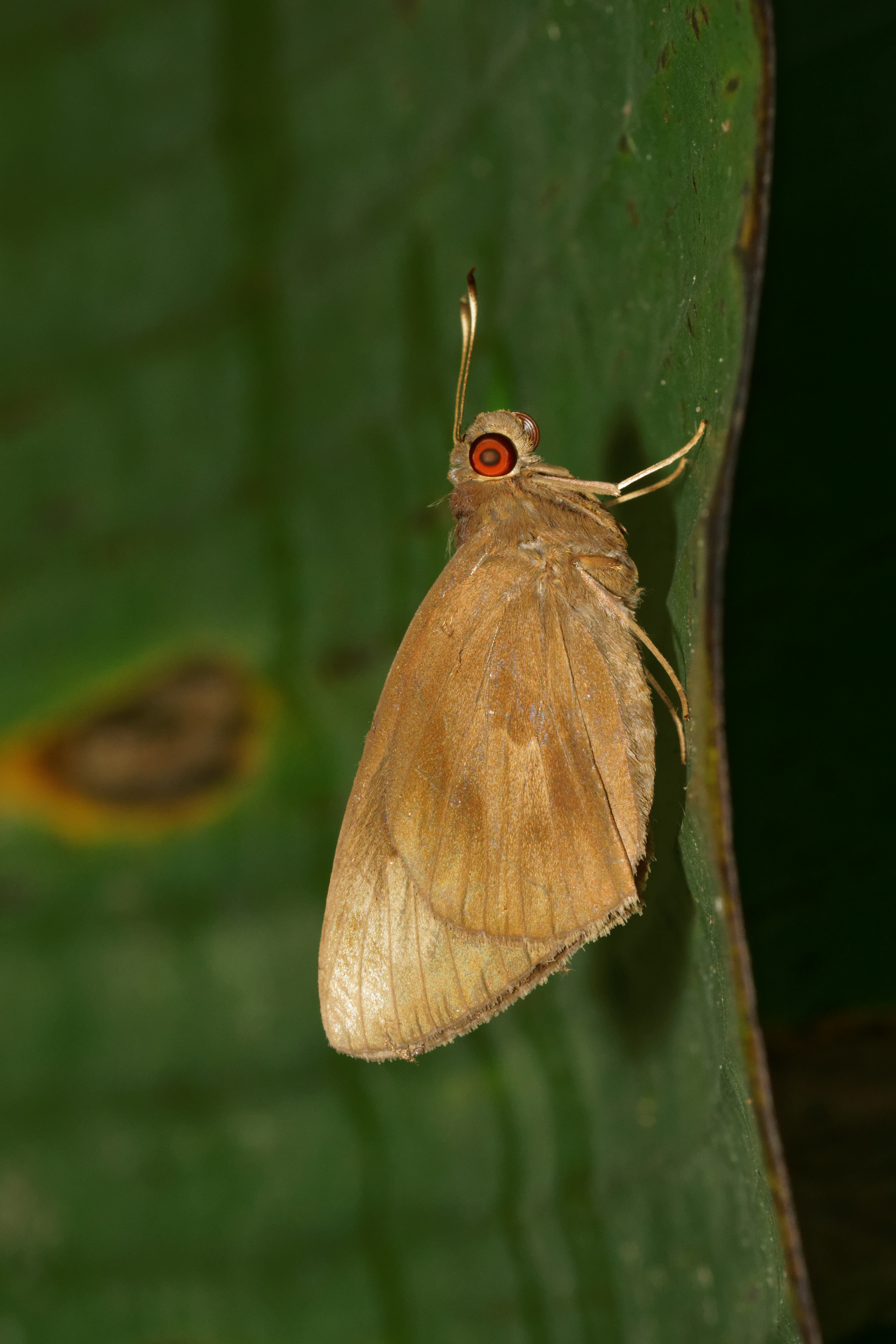

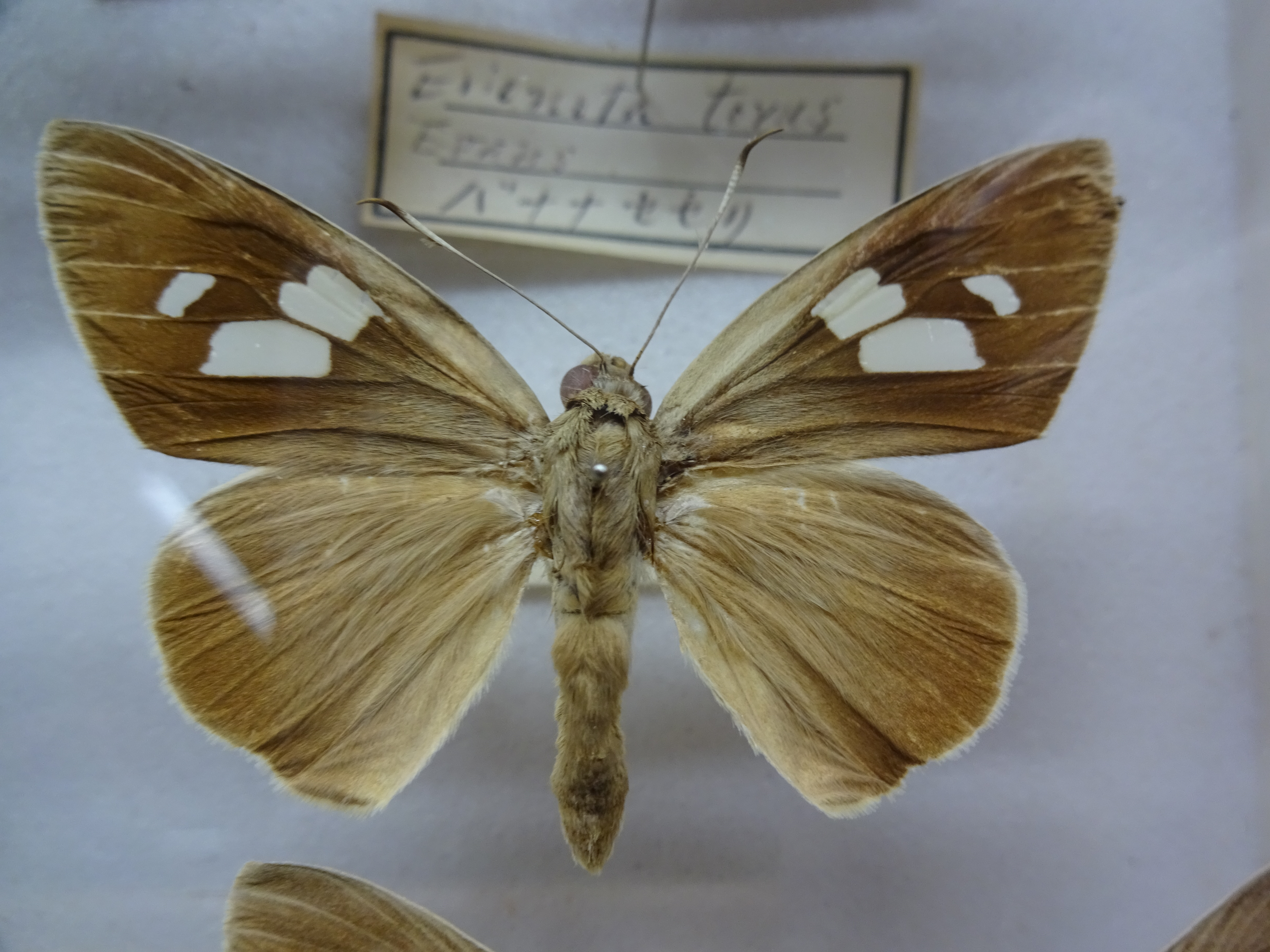

Scientific classification
- Kingdom: Animalia
- Phylum: Arthropoda
- Clade: Pancrustacea
- Class: Insecta
- Order: Lepidoptera
- Family: Hesperiidae
- Genus: Erionota
- Species: E. torus

Binomial name
- Erionota torus Evans, 1941

= Erionota torus =

Species of butterfly

Erionota torus, also known as the rounded palm-redeye, Sikkim palm dart, Sikkim palm red-eye and banana skipper, is a species of butterfly of the family Hesperiidae. It was described by William Harry Evans in 1941. It is found from southern and northeast India to Burma, Thailand, Laos, Vietnam, Malaysia, Singapore and China. It has also been recorded from Taiwan.

The wingspan is 65–70 mm. Adults have been recorded on wing in April to November. They feed on flowers nectar of banana trees.

The larvae feed on Musa coccina, Musa formosana, Musa nana, Musa sapientum, Musa uranoscopos and Cocos nucifera. They make leaf shelters. The larvae reach a length of about 50 mm. Pupation occurs inside the leaf shelter.
