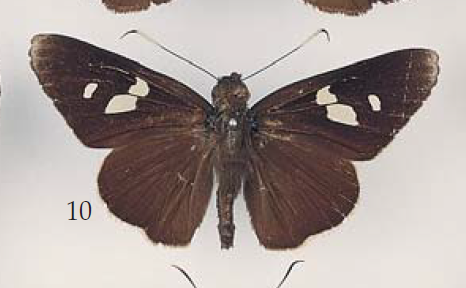

Scientific classification
- Kingdom: Animalia
- Phylum: Arthropoda
- Class: Insecta
- Order: Lepidoptera
- Family: Hesperiidae
- Genus: Erionota
- Species: E. hiraca

Binomial name
- Erionota hiraca (Moore, 1881)

= Erionota hiraca =

Species of butterfly

Erionota hiraca is a species of Indomalayan butterfly in the family Hesperiidae. It is found in Burma, Thailand, N.Vietnam, Malaysia, Singapore, Borneo, Nias, Batoe, Sipora, Java, Bali, Lombok and Sulawesi.
