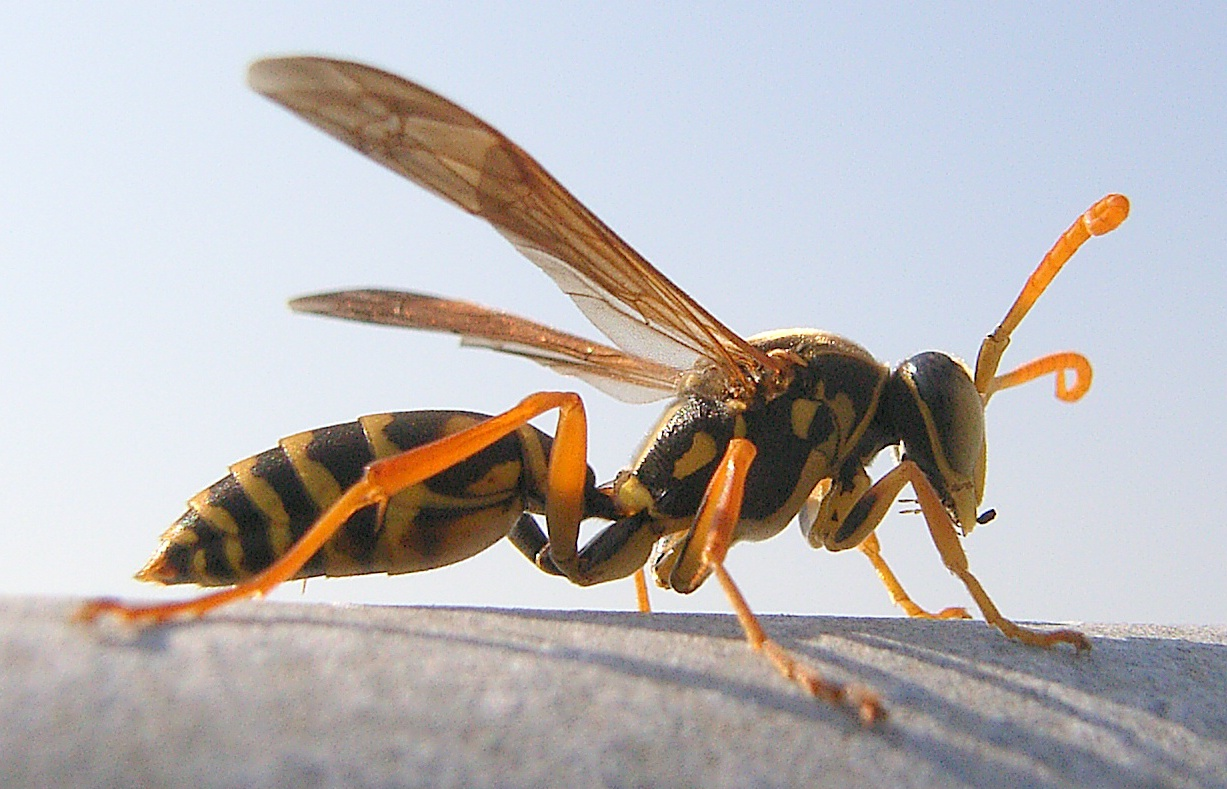
- Polistes chinensis antennalis

Scientific classification
- Kingdom: Animalia
- Phylum: Arthropoda
- Clade: Pancrustacea
- Class: Insecta
- Order: Hymenoptera
- Family: Vespidae
- Subfamily: Polistinae
- Tribe: Polistini
- Genus: Polistes
- Species: P. chinensis

Binomial name
- Polistes chinensis (Fabricius, 1793)

Synonyms
- Euodynerus caspicus (Morawitz, 1873); Euodynerus caspicus subsp. astrachanensis Blüthgen, 1942; Lionotus cardinalis Morawitz, 1885; Polistes caspicus Yoshik., 1962

= Polistes chinensis =

Species of wasp

Polistes chinensis is a polistine vespid wasp in the cosmopolitan genus Polistes, and is commonly known as the Asian, Chinese or Japanese paper wasp. Approximately 300 species of paper wasps have been identified worldwide. Polistes chinensis is found in East Asia, in particular China and Japan. The subspecies P. chinensis antennalis is an invasive species in New Zealand, having arrived in 1979, and more recently Australia.

The wasps prey on invertebrates, especially caterpillars. In this species, queens destroy up to 70% of worker-laid eggs and are aided by workers in a process known as worker policing.

== Taxonomy and phylogeny ==
P. chinensis is a member of the cosmopolitan genus Polistes, the largest genus in the family Vespidae, with over 300 recognized species and subspecies. Two subspecies are known:

- P. chinensis chinensis, (Fabricius, 1793)
- P. chinensis antennalis Pérez, 1905

== Description and identification ==
The Asian paper wasp has a slender body about 13 to 25 mm (0.51 to 0.98 in) in length. Their bodies are reddish brown or black, with yellow rings and reddish areas on the abdomen. Their wings are reddish or amber brown, and they have long legs that hang down during flight. The general morphology of the spermatheca is similar in both reproductive and non-reproductive individuals. The spermathecal gland attaches to the central region of the spermatheca.

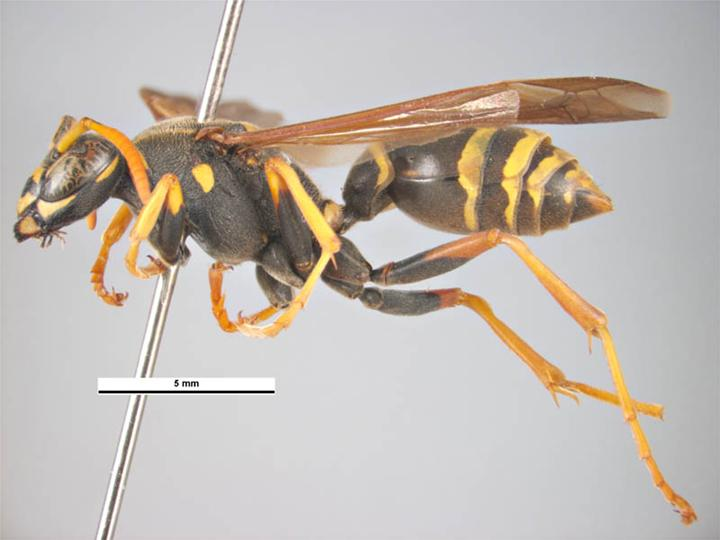
Lateral view- female

== Distribution and habitat ==
The Asian paper wasp frequently constructs nests on man-made structures including houses and buildings. It will also build nests on trees or bushes, usually on branches, but sometimes on leaves as well. P. chinensis prefers to colonize urban habitats, but nests have also been recorded near forest clearings. They sometimes build their nests in dense shrubs, making them difficult to locate. Large populations usually develop in warm, lowland areas with open habitat such as shrublands, swamps and meadows.

The paper wasp is native to East Asia. It has been recorded in China, Japan, Korea and Mongolia. The subspecies P. chinensis antennalis is invasive in New Zealand. It is widespread in the North Island and the northern South Island and competes with native species for food, It has since been recorded in Norfolk Island and New South Wales. At least two independent invasion events, linked to Kanto and Kyushu, Japan, have been proposed as sources of the New Zealand wasps. The Asian paper wasp was first recorded in New Zealand in 1979, in Kohimarama and the Whangaparāoa Peninsula. It remained confined to these areas of Auckland until 1984, when it began appearing in inner city areas and western suburbs.

== Natural history ==
=== Colony cycle ===
An overwintered female, who has been inseminated during the previous autumn, emerges during the spring and begins nest cell construction and egg laying. The first broods emerge in late spring or early summer and are entirely female. Males are produced from early summer onwards. Following male production, no more females are produced for the rest of the season. This colony cycle can be divided into three stages: a solitary stage, a superindividual stage and a social stage. During the solitary stage the foundress builds the nest and cares for the first generation of brood. This stage ends when the first workers emerge. The superindividual stage ends when the first reproductive forms emerge. The social stage ends when the colony disintegrates.

=== Resource allocation ===
Food collection is very costly to the foundress of a colony and carries a high risk of mortality. However, it is a necessary activity for colony survival. Most collected proteinaceous material is consumed by larvae. A significant amount, fourteen percent, is allocated to oral secretions. Polistes chinensis, like many social wasps, uses a proteinaceous oral secretion to glue nest material to maintain and build the nest. The oral secretion of P. chinensis is 73% proteinaceous materials. The queen will augment this investment in response to the environment. Oral secretions increase during rainy seasons, because the foundress must smear oral secretion frequently over the nest surfaces to avoid risk of destruction. Nests in exposed sites vs. sheltered sites show no significant difference in dry weight of secretions produced by the foundress. However, foundresses that nest in sheltered sites bring in more prey than those at exposed sites. Therefore, the relative amount of proteinaceous resources allocated to oral secretions is greater, at 22%.

=== Cannibalism ===
Foraging by a lone foundress has a high cost of predation risk for both herself and her brood. Furthermore, foraging success of a lone foundress has been estimated to be low. Rather than increase foraging time, P. chinensis will cannibalize their own larvae when there is not enough honey or prey available during the solitary stage of colony development. The foundress targets larvae of different developmental stages depending on whether prey or honey is the limiting resource. Under scarce prey condition, foundresses cannibalize young larvae and intensively feed them to older larvae to ensure successful production of the first generation of workers. It is important that the queen successfully rear the first set of brood because she has a high risk of mortality while maintaining the nest on her own. In a honey limited environment, older larvae are more likely to be targeted. When larvae do not consume honey, they no longer produce saliva, which is an important nutrient resource for the adult wasp. When large larvae cannot produce enough saliva they are more likely to be cannibalized as a nutrient resource for the foundress herself.

=== Nest guarding ===
Foundresses need to leave the nest to gather prey, nest materials and water. When she does so there is a risk that conspecific females will depredate her brood. These females fly to a nest, pull out a single larva and return to their own nests to feed their own larva with it. Foundresses chase off attacking females by spiral flight, whereby two females fly in the air in a double helix pattern. Attendance on nests successfully deters attacking females. Foundresses use the loss of a larva as a cue to assess predation risk, and increase their defense efforts in response. When a larva is removed, lone foundresses increase the total time spent on the nest by decreasing time spent on each off nest activities, and increasing the time interval between consecutive activities. There is not a difference in the number of off nest activities. After 30 minutes following the removal of a larva, the time spent on the nest begins returning to the pre-removal level. After 60 minutes, time spent on the nest returns to pre-removal levels.

== Kin selection ==
=== Genetic relatedness within colonies ===
Asian paper wasps are monandrous. Like other species of eusocial wasp, males are haploid and emerge from unfertilized eggs. Workers are .5 times genetically related to their sons, .375 times to their nephews, .25 times to their brothers, and .75 times to their sisters. According to kin selection theory, this relatedness predicts worker queen conflict. Workers should police the foundresses male eggs. However, this model does not seem to apply to P. chinensis. In fact, the opposite occurs, workers police each other.

=== Reproduction conflict ===
Workers police each others' eggs. 88.5% of queens' eggs survive to hatching vs 1.4% of workers'. Worker reproduction is frequent in queen-right colonies in which the queen is alive. Both queen and workers replaced workers' eggs. Polistes chinensis was studied alongside Polistes snelleni for comparison in this conflict. In P. snelleni, queens monopolize egg production. Queens contributed 2.4 times more to replacing than workers. Workers sequentially perform oophagy and oviposition in the same cells. The ratio of worker-produced eggs to eggs laid by the queen is 3 or 4 times to one in a colony having between 100 and 500 wasps.

=== Worker-worker conflict ===
Worker-worker policing is predicted to occur in polyandrous nests. A few hypotheses have been proposed to explain worker policing in the monandrous P. chinensis. The colony efficiency hypothesis proposes that worker policing is selected for because worker production imposes a cost on worker productivity. However worker oophagy is only observed in conjunction with oviposition. The colony efficiency theory predicts that even non reproductive workers would participate in policing. Another explanation is that worker policing occurs because of the size constraints of the colony. Workers collectively produce more eggs than the queen. The difference in egg production becomes more pronounced as the colony grows larger. Therefore, as nest size increases, competition for limited oviposition space becomes more intense, with workers destroying their nestmates eggs so they have room for their own. This theory has yet to be confirmed.

=== Worker-queen conflict ===
Foundresses in P. chinensis control colony investment but allow worker oviposition. On average, around 40% of males in queen-right colonies are the sons of workers. The observed sex allocation ratio in field observations performed by the Natural History Museum and Institute in Japan was .61, while the expected ratio in queen-right colonies is .48. Variation in sex allocation ratio is likely explained by limited queen control.

== Interaction with other species ==
=== Diet ===
P. chinensis collects nectar and honeydew from flowers. The wasp preys on invertebrates, preferring larvae and caterpillars of lepidopteran insects (moths and butterflies) for protein resources, but may also feed on marine invertebrates or fish carrion when the opportunity arises. Asian paper wasps also feed on the larvae of other conspecific females. Larval saliva is an important nutrient resource for adult Asian paper wasps. This contains a high concentration of free amino acids, 50 times that of floral nectars, and is nutritionally analogous to nectar.
