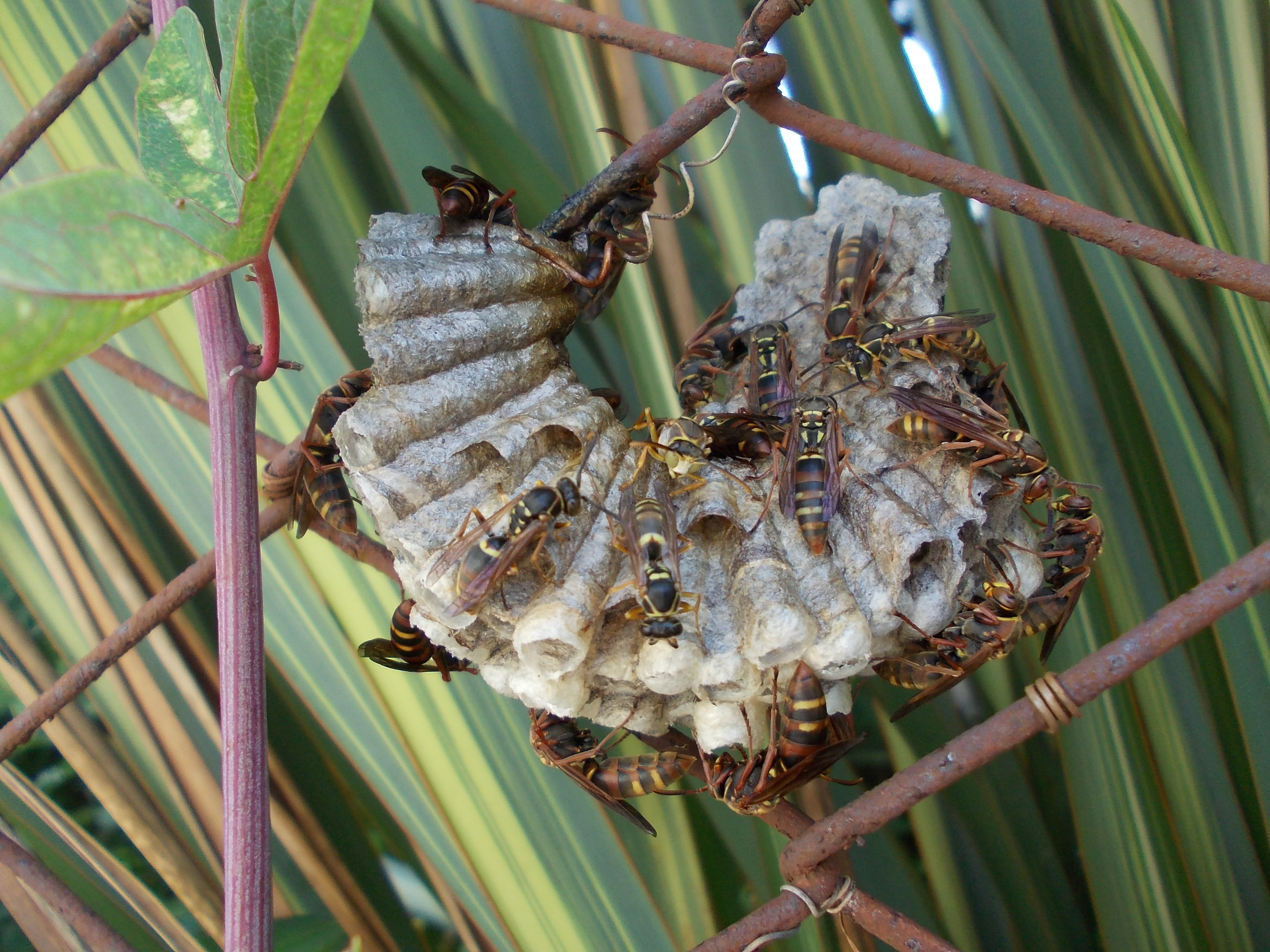

Scientific classification
- Kingdom: Animalia
- Phylum: Arthropoda
- Class: Insecta
- Order: Hymenoptera
- Family: Vespidae
- Subfamily: Polistinae
- Tribe: Polistini
- Genus: Polistes
- Species: P. snelleni

Binomial name
- Polistes snelleni (de Saussure, 1862)

Synonyms
- Allorhynchium snelleni (Saussure, 1862); Allorhynchium snelleni subsp. imitator Vecht, 1963); Odynerus aurivillianus Schulthess, 1913; Polistes nigrihumerus Uchida, 1936; Polistes nigrohumerus Uchida, 1936

= Polistes snelleni =

Species of wasp

Polistes snelleni, the Japanese paper wasp, is a common social wasp species in central and northern Japan. P. snelleni is also found in northern China, Korea, and the Russian Far East. Due to the different climates in these regions, P. snelleni is able to adapt to different temperatures and climatic conditions. P. snelleni is typically found in hilly or submontane areas, so they are classified in the semi-highland category.

== Taxonomy and phylogeny ==
P. snelleni is in the genus Polistes, with the subgenus Polistella, a paraphyletic subgenus. P. snelleni is most closely related to Polistes stigma bernadii. It is also closely related to Polistes japonicus. P. snelleni has been studied alongside Polistes chinensis, and Polistes biglumis for comparison in worker-worker conflict, which are two other paper wasps.

== Description and identification ==
P. snelleni wasps are black and yellow. The queens are the biggest of the species, and the workers, young queens, and males follow. Workers typically have worn wings that distinguish them from young queens. The weight of new reproductive females (young queens) is 102 mg. Workers can be identified by white-creamy body fat. Workers that have developed ovaries are workers, but not reproductive females.

The nests created by P. snelleni are made vertically. They typically consist of a single comb. The comb is fan-shaped and the pedicel is attached to the basal cell. This setup allows new cells to be added distally. The founding queen uses twigs or the surface of rock overhangs as horizontal supports for the nest. The nest petioles (stems) are perpendicular to these supports. These wasps occupy a vertical zone of 200–400 meters.

== Distribution and habitat ==
P. snelleni is typically found in Japan, and sometimes in China or Korea. The species prefers grassy or bushy places in temperate areas. Their nests are typically found on south-facing slopes in areas filled with small trees and short weeds. These nests are hung from small trees, oftentimes larch trees, and usually hang at about 20–60 cm above the ground. They also nest in roadsides and rocky cliffs, in the spaces under overhangs. The temperature in these sites rises in the daytime because the rocks absorb heat from the sun.

== Colony cycle ==
In northern Japan near Sapporo, nests are covered with snow until early April. About 2 weeks later, the single founding queen arrives to start the nest, falling under the category of haplometrotic foundation. The first worker in the nest emerges in early July, and all emerge within a couple of days. The workers are produced by eggs that were laid at the beginning of the nest formation. The incubation period is about 60 days for a worker. P. snelleni only has 5-15 workers in a single nest, proving to be one of the smallest in Japan. Males in P. snelleni emerge after workers, during a period of 1–2 weeks, in cells that are separated from those that produce workers. There are about 10-20 males in an average nest, which is only a bit more than the number of workers. Young queens (about 30-50) also come about during this time, in late July, in northern Japan. In central Japan, the young queens come about a month later in the middle of August. Reproductive females mate during the nesting season. These young queens are particularly aggressive. It sometimes happens that there are dwarf queens that arise in the nest, that look vaguely like workers. These emerge in late August when only a few workers remain in the nest and the food supplies have dwindled. These dwarf queens have a low chance of mating because most of the males have died. Eggs and larvae disappear in middle and later August respectively.

=== Construction of nest ===
The rate of construction of the nest begins as relatively high and then drops with the hatching of larvae. During this time, though, the founding queen only constructs about one-third of the total cells, and half of the cocoon spinning (10 cocoons total are made). The queen uses pulp (paper) for construction, collected from outside the nest or by taking it from workers who have collected it. This is a forceful action (called robbing) by the founding queen, as the workers resist this. Later, the rate of construction picks up again, in conjunction with the maturation of larvae and cocoon spinning by the founding queen. The rate then increases consistently until the sign of the first workers' arrival. During this time, prior to the first workers arrival, the queen successfully constructs more cells, leading to a total construction of about 70% of the nests total cells. The superindividual stage, where workers and the queen coexist harmoniously to meet the needs of the nest, lasts only about a week. Once the workers are hatched, the third peak in cell construction occurs, and about 15% of the cells are produced by workers that have had a few days to rest before working.

=== Egg laying ===
The queen lays less than 1.5 eggs per day on average. She lays eggs parallel to the construction of the cells. She may lay two eggs in the same cell, even if other open cells are available; in this case, only one egg develops, but no more than 20% of the cells are empty at a time. A queen does not reuse cells once an egg has occupied them.

== Behavior ==
=== Division of labor ===
The P.snelleni queens rise at sunrise and stop their activities at sunset. The queens begin their activities only when their body temperature is high enough from receiving sunbeams. This may not occur right at sunrise, but in the later months when the temperature is higher, the queen can start her activities earlier. The behaviors of P. snelleni males and females are quite distinct. Males rest in the nest and beg the workers for food, occasionally visiting flowers. Females, though, have different behaviors. Females rarely leave the brood, only sometimes to bring water drops to ventilate the nest on hot days. Food regurgitation is observed among females.

=== Water transport ===
P. snelleni exists in temperate locations, where cold and hot weather conditions can arise. When the temperature becomes hot, as it often does in Japan during the summer when the P. snelleni nests are active, the paper wasps need to take measures to cool down the nest. Water transport to the nest occurs after the appearance of larvae, and once it starts, occurs about 10-15 times in succession. Water drops are carried by the wasps and put on the concave nest roof. This aids in cooling the nest. When shade is over the nest, the wasps move the water and throw it away.

== Interaction with other species ==
=== Diet ===
The founding queen of a nest goes through the process of first hunting, then the disposition of prey, transport, another disposition, and then finally giving food to the larvae. The larvae are fed with animal diet. The queen finds the prey in a single flight from the nest that lasts usually 10–30 minutes. The queen sucks fluid from a pellet on the nest or nearby, and feeds it to the young larvae. The feeding is done by an antenna inserted in a cell where the larvae are. There is solid residual left from the pellet which the queen eats or throws out. When there are different ages of larvae present, the pellet is given to older larvae first and then the queen gives the leftover fluid to all the larvae, both young and old.

=== Parasitoidism ===
P. snelleni is a host wasp for the parasitoid Elasmus japonicus, a smaller species of wasp. Adults of E. japonicus sit on leaves and twigs near the nests of P. snelleni, and fly around the nests. When P. snelleni notice that E. japonicus is near the nest, they flutter their wings and dart on the comb. Sometimes, P. snelleni bite and kill E. japonicus. P. snelleni recognize parasitized cells in their nests and host the remnants of the parasite there. It is beneficial for P. snelleni to kill the parasitoid larvae because adult E. japonicus could reparasitize the nest.

== Worker queen conflict ==
=== Orphan colonies ===
Orphan colonies are colonies that are maintained by workers after the queen is gone from the nest. Orphaned workers have the ability to mate and produce female offspring, but they only begin to oviposit after the queen has disappeared. This is unique to P. snelleni. Orphaned workers can act essentially as replacement queens, because they can inhibit mating in other workers and founding queens. It has been said that P. snelleni goes by the mode of serial polygyny, however this was disproven because by the time new reproductive females are ready to reproduce, the season is ending. So, only a few queen replacements can occur. There are usually 1-2 laying workers that are elderly in these orphan colonies. The dominant laying workers in a nest have a monopoly over ovipositions by selectively egg-eating.

=== Conflict over egg laying ===
Since the founding queens of P. snelleni are likely to disappear, it is necessary that these orphaned workers have the ability to reproduce females for future generations to exist. There is social tension over reproduction between queens and workers because of this, where queens monopolize egg production while they are in the nest.

Queens of P. snelleni produce males before females, which is called protandrous production. This is driven by sexual selection for the optimum sex ratio, and so there is a higher fitness for all. Because of protandrous production, orphaned workers are selected to produce female offspring, since they are reproducing so late in the season. They mate in order to make diploid female offspring.

=== Colony productivity ===
Climate is a key factor that has been studied in the colony productivity of P. snelleni. Since there is always one founding queen in a P. snelleni nest, the denominator of colony productivity is always one. Productivity was found to vary drastically with a couple of very large nests that were found in Kanto, Japan. These nests had hundreds of cells in comparison to the usually 100 cells. In these nests, there was a female-biased sex ratio, which lines up with the resource availability hypothesis. This hypothesis states that colonies with better resources should be more heavily female based. The numbers of first brood workers in these nests were not greater than other nests, but there were a lot more females, so the sex ratio was heavily female.

== Special nests ==
A special-case nest observed in Mt. Hakken-zan in the summer of 1968 showed two queens sharing one nest. This nest was unsuccessful, as predicted. Whether the nest was an instance of temporary pleometrosis, where two queens cooperate in the initial stages of nest building, and then one leaves, is unclear. A multiple-comb nest was found with one queen in Tokyo in 1980. The nest sat on a wire fence, and the two petioles were merely 13 mm apart. This nest was founded by a worker, in contrast with the well-known fact that P. snelleni nests are founded by a single queen. The worker reared brood in both combs at the same time. Early emerging males were often spotted around this special nest, so the worker that ho created the nest is assumed to have copulated with at least one early-emerging male.

== Early-emerging males ==
The founding queen of a nest is known to produce her first brood to be workers. In a study about early-emerging males in this initial brood of workers, many observations were taken. First, the possibility of sibling mating was quite high in nests with early-emerging males. No early-emerging males were found to be diploid in chromosome number. So, the early-emerging males were haploid, with the number chromosomes in a haploid set being 30. This was in contrast with previously known data where the number of haploid chromosomes had been set at 13. These chromosomes were observed to be meta- or submetacentrics. Nests with early-emerging males had a strong possibility of mating between these males and the workers of the same brood.
