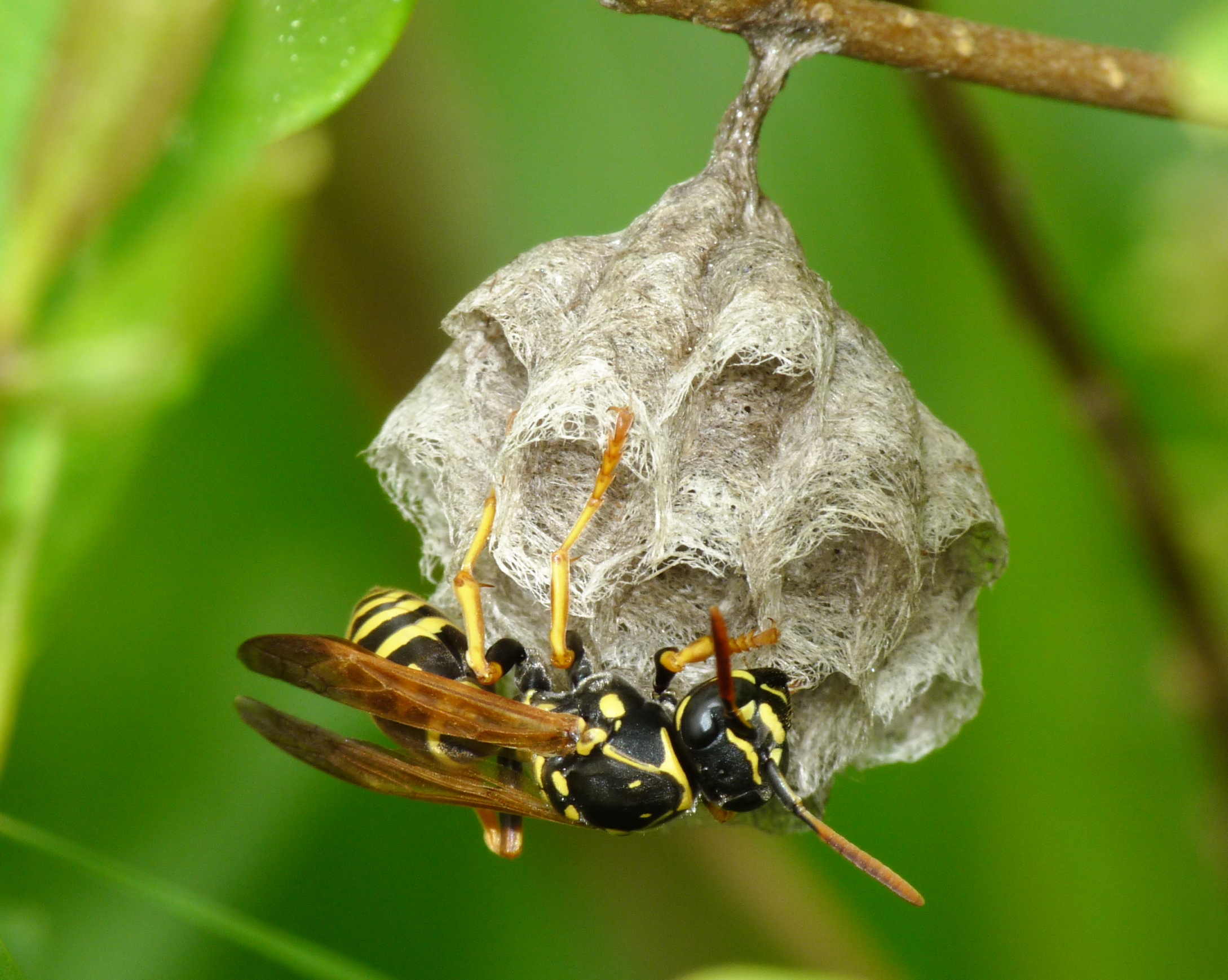
- Female on nest

Scientific classification
- Kingdom: Animalia
- Phylum: Arthropoda
- Clade: Pancrustacea
- Class: Insecta
- Order: Hymenoptera
- Family: Vespidae
- Subfamily: Polistinae
- Tribe: Polistini
- Genus: Polistes
- Species: P. nimpha

Binomial name
- Polistes nimpha (Christ, 1791)

Synonyms
- Vespa nimpha (Christ, 1791); Vespa diadema (Latreille, 1802); Polistes opinabilis (Kohl, 1898); Polistes moltonii (Guiglia, 1944); Polistes nimpha irakensis (Gusenleitner, 1962)

= Polistes nimpha =

Species of wasp

Polistes nimpha is a eusocial paper wasp found all over Europe, with particular sightings in Turkey, Finland, Estonia, and Latvia. It is also found in northern Africa, Pakistan, Iran, India (especially in the northern states of Jammu and Kashmir and Himachal Pradesh), Kazakhstan, Mongolia, and China. The climate in these areas is relatively cold and snowy in the winter, while summers are usually hot and dry, with steppe vegetation. Polistes nimpha colonies are relatively small and easily manipulated.

== Taxonomy and phylogeny ==
The genus Polistes is known for its morphological and behavioral uniformity. Richards (1973) was the first to propose a global classification of Polistes. The Polistinae have a large tropical distribution and are the most diverse subfamily of the Vespidae. The genus Polistes is extensive and inhabits North America, all the way to Eurasia. One may distinguish between closely related Polistes species by comparing the color traits. Wasps of the genus Polistes (Latreille, 1802) are good examples for studying alternative phenotypes in social insects. Their small colony size, accessible nests, and moderate aggressiveness enable them to be studied comprehensively.

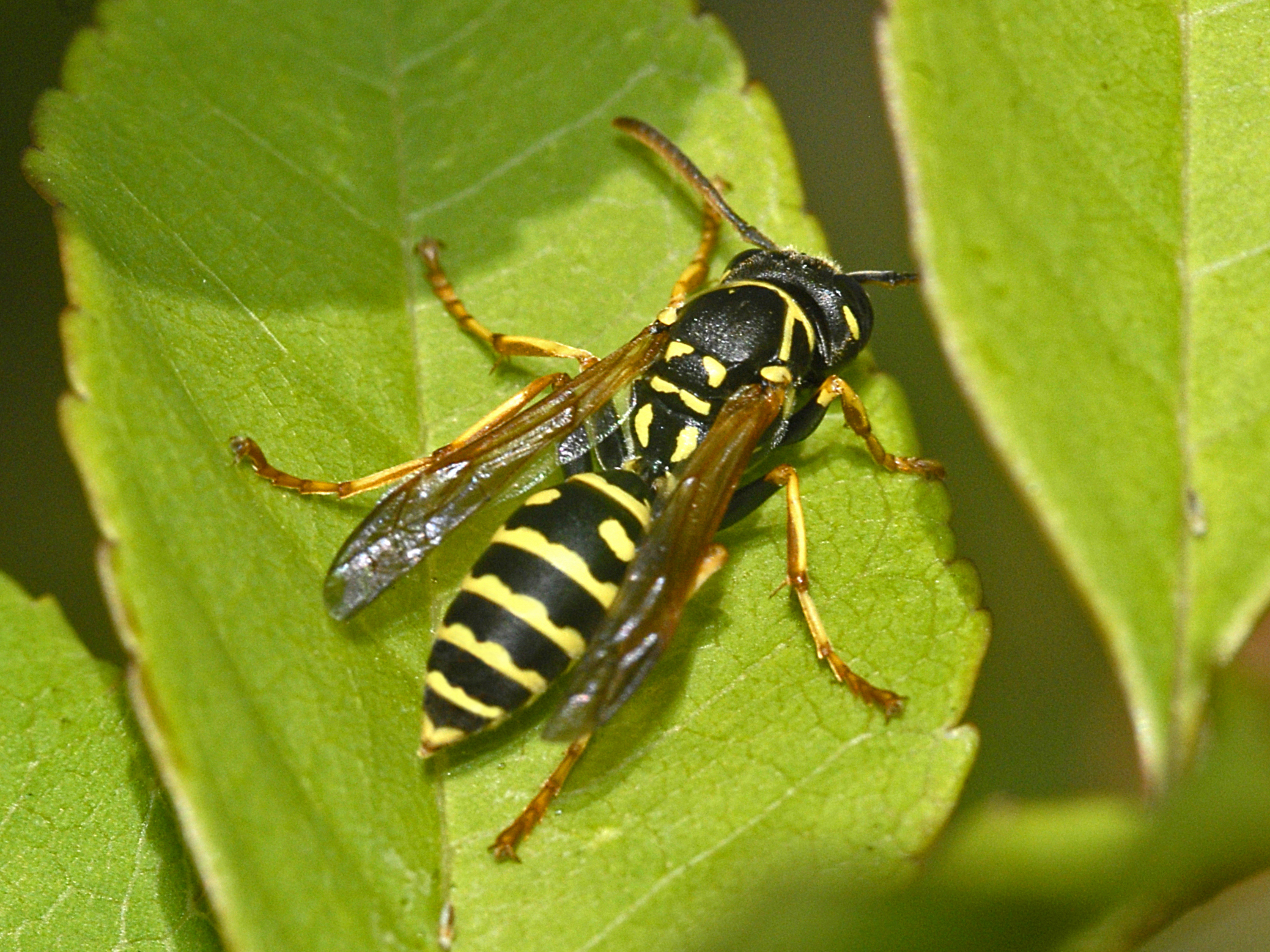
Polistes nimpha

== Description and identification ==
The Polistes nimpha is usually more black-patterned compared to Polistes dominula, but it is very difficult to morphologically differentiate between the females of Polistes nimpha, Polistes dominula and Polistes associus. In females, the color of the malar area (between the mandible and compound eye) is yellow and the 6th gastral sternum is black, rarely with a yellowish apical spot. In males, the clypeus (the broad plate at the front of the head) has lateral ridges; dorsal length of apical antennal segment 2.2–2.9 times as long as its maximal width, 1.3–1.5 times as long as fifth antennal segment. In both sexes the apical half of antenna is more or less darkened dorsally. The venom gland of Polistes nimpha has a muscular poison sac in the shape of an oval. The tip of the stinger is curled at the peak towards the middle, and the palps are shorter than the stinger. The terminal palps are covered with substantial feathers.

=== Nests appearance and materials ===
The nests are beige and grey with dark grey lines. Their sizes vary, with measurements ranging from 8.5 cm × 9.6 cm (3.3 in × 3.8 in) to 3.8 cm × 5 cm (1.5 in × 2.0 in). The central cells are oriented in relation to the ground morphology. Polistes nimpha usually nest in trees and sometimes in cavities. A nest consists of a single resinous pedicel and a comb not covered by envelope. Since there are no envelopes on Polistes nests, the temperature is not internally maintained inside the nest. Thus, outer temperatures must coincide with the species needs for offspring development.However, during the hottest times, wasps are able to actively cool the nest by ventilating it with the movement of their wings.

The species uses a mixture of oral secretions and plant fibers, called paper pulp, to build their nests. These chewed plant fibers from weathered wood and other sources constitute the nest's make-up. The fibers are gathered from areas proximate to the nesting site. The oral secretions ensure the durability of the nest during rain and weathering. The duration of chewing ultimately determines the absorbency of the nest paper. The chewing period of pulps may differ amongst individual colonies.

The nests also consist of organic and inorganic materials; nitrogen is used for the production of the oral secretion, while oxygen, carbon, silisium, calcium, aluminum, potassium, and iron are found in fragments of the nest and within its walls. The amount of protein incorporated into the construction of nests may depend on environment conditions. Correspondingly, the amount of oral secretion used for the nest is positively correlated to the nest's exposure to rainfall.

== Distribution and habitat ==
The species has a transpalearctic range Polistes nimpha prefer low and relatively warm, uncultivated lands. The wasps prefer to nest on plants, under eaves of roofs and buildings, and in closed areas. Colonies with only one female foundress reside on vegetation, while colonies with two or more female foundresses are usually found in covered and sheltered areas.

== Life cycle ==
Colonies may either be haplometrotic or pleiometrotic. Haplometrotic colonies have a single foundress female, while pleiometrotic colonies have two or more foundress females. The fertile foundresses live through the winter and build a nest in the beginning of May. They raise the first generation of workers, which emerge in the first half of June. Over the summer the colony develops and switches from rearing workers to raising sexual individuals; these sexual individuals include males and future foundresses. In August, there is a mass emergence of the male species, and only after this, do the future foundresses appear. The colony begins to disintegrate in late summer and declines throughout autumn. Once the reproductive individuals mate, the males and workers die. By the end of autumn, only the future foundresses are left to survive the winter and begin the cycle again in May. Polistes colonies found in Turkey are found to be univoltine (have one generation per year). Polistes nimpha colonies are small, averaging less than 100 workers per colony.

== Behavior ==
=== Division of labor and resources ===
The specialization of workers occurs due to age-related polyethism; workers take on specific functions depending on their age within the colony. The Polistes nimpha also have specialized foragers: those who collect and those who utilize. Foragers bring food (prey and nectar) and building materials (wood pulp and water) into the nest and give them to the workers. Individual foragers may deliver one type or both load options throughout its active period. However, if a forager switches to a different kind of load, it usually belongs to the same functional group (food or net materials). There are three functional groups that divide the workers. This division is based on their foraging and handling specializations. The first group is builders: workers who prefer hunting to building and who tend to pass proteinaceous food to other individuals. The second group is prey foragers: workers who deliver building materials but do not pass prey to other workers. The third group includes the non-foraging workers, who engage solely in activities within the nest. Active builders are involved in establishing and maintaining the worker's dominance structure. While food was shared amongst individual foragers, building material and water were used only by the individual who had initially brought them.

=== Nesting and hierarchy ===
The behavior and process of nest building consists of foragers delivering the paper material to the construction place; the foundress moving over the area and sometimes exhibiting wagging and/or trapping movements with its abdomen; the foundress grasping the entire amount of materials or some part of it; and the construction of the petiole, cell base, or cell wall. The foundresses wag their abdomens while keeping the batch of pulp in their mandibles. They continue this wagging movement until they find a suitable place to apply the pulp. The foundress may sometimes take the nest material (partly or completely) from the foragers who brought it to the nest. This particular behavior is more common amongst foundresses who occupy larger nests. Foundresses may exhibit dominant behavior towards workers whenever workers attempt to lay eggs. If this happens, the worker's wing tips can become damaged from the foundress's aggressive attacks.

=== Foundresses and kin recognition ===
Females often retreat under eaves after hibernation and before the foundation of new nests. Nests are likely to be destroyed during the winter; therefore foundresses sometimes find refuge in parental nests. This retreat is more likely to nests that are sheltered, rather than nests built on vegetation or perches. Since foundresses are siblings, their return to maternal nests enables them to come together before founding new colonies. This philopatric occurrence guides how foundresses establish their colonies in the spring and also influences with whom they build their nests near. The relative reproductive potential of a female may play a role in whether their colony is pleiometrotic or haplometrotic. If a foundress's first nest is destroyed, she will either rebuild it or join an alien colony. More than 15% of foundresses mate twice, instead of just mating once. Foundresses differ from other female generations in phenotype; and this is a result of population adaptation to their environment. Since efficient foundresses are favored for emergence, they contribute to the species overall adaptation. A female's surrounding environment ultimately influences their phenotypic variation. Some examples of these effects include: long absences of rain, cold winters, predators and parasitoids. Phenotypic variation of a new generation of foundresses can also be caused by genetic shifts. For example, population density and larval diet can impact the wasps’ individual success. The more irregular and unpredictable a given habitat is, the more phenotypic changes occur in future foundresses. Thus, it can be inferred that Polistes nimpha are quite sensitive to climate changes.

=== Living in groups ===
Two types of foundresses can be identified for their difference in founding behavior: generalists and specialists. Generalists are females that find nesting places first. They can attract other foundresses, and they are vulnerable to attracting predators. These pioneering colonies are the first to be attacked by entomophages, such as the parasitic wasp L. argiolus, the hornet Vespa crabro, and ants. Females who nest later and establish colonies separately or on the edge of large aggregations are not attacked by entomophages as often and are usually invaded at later dates. Specialists on the other hand, are females that prefer to nest proximate to already founded nests. If specialists join the colonies of foundresses from the first group, the specialists take on subordinate positions.

Research on Female identification
In their research article on phenotypic variability of foundresses, Rusina and Orlova suggest the two groups of Polistes nimpha females are phenotypically distinguishable. Generalists are identified with non-infested individuals reared under favorable conditions, while specialists are identified with infested females, reared under conditions of insufficient nutrition. Infested individuals are inferior in size to non-infested females, and they exhibit a lighter pigment on the mesoscutum. There also seems to be a correlation between the worker population and the foundresses’ pigmentation: the more workers there are in a colony, the darker the foundresses mesoscutum is.

=== Territorial behavior ===
In the late summer, males patrol and defend small areas of territory, usually around hedges and bushes. A male generally lands with his head directed towards the upper edge of the leaf. Then he rotates in a circle while dragging the ventral part of his abdomen, ending with his head facing in the opposite direction. Rotational direction is the same for a given wasp, and he usually cleans his posterior legs and abdomen afterwards. This movement may enable sexual pheromones to be deposited over territorial perches. The exocrine glands, found in the sternal gastral hypodermis of males, are the site for biosynthesis and storage of various excretions. These secretory glands are involved in the production of a wide range of substances, such as repellent, venom in females, and potentially sexual pheromones in males. Resident males attack anything that flies near their territories, including other males, flies, other insects, and even paper models attached to the tips of grass stalks. Territorial males assault and bite the head and legs of intruders, sometimes leading to permanent impairment of the antennae and legs. Males can take on aggressive postures before attacking; they exhibit open mandibles and raised wings and antennae. Butting wasps typically hover in the air, and fights between neighboring territories are quite common. Territories of male Polistes nimpha seem to be purely symbolic and are comparable to leks of vertebrates, as well as the pheromone-marked sites of many bees.

=== Mating system ===
Mate-searching is concentrated to a limited portion of the Polistes nimpha habitat. Males gather in great numbers; either flying high above the ground where matings can take place or perched near hibernation places waiting for uninseminated females. The criteria for these locations depend on accessibility to the nests, appropriate hibernacula, foraging areas, hilltops, landmarks and other environmental necessities. Males land under specific conditions of temperature and insulation; if clouds cover the sun, the wasps may leave the hedges and return when the sun is back out. It is common for male individuals to rub their gastral sterna, mandible, and/or legs on various perches. This behavior seems to be associated with a pheromonal release and has been interpreted to function as scent-marking. Throughout September and October, males congregate in low enclosure walls, fences, or shrub and tree hedges in order to defend and scent-mark selected perches. They leave their mark by rubbing their gastral sterna in a circular motion across the surface of branches. Individual territorial boundaries inevitably overlap and differ depending on the density and aggressiveness of males. Contrary to Polistes dominula behavior, Polistes nimpha exhibit no evidence for alternative strategies or conspicuous size differences among individuals. Polistes nimpha's mate-finding strategy incorporates a complex of the two sites: resting and scent-marking. In order to navigate within this network, the species requires well-developed spatial memory. Landmarks and perches can be considered “hotspots,” since individuals are more likely to encounter a receptive mate at those locations.

== Parasitoidism ==
Latibulus argiolus (Rossi) (Hymenoptera, Ichneumonidae) and Elasmus schmitti (Ruschka) (Hymenoptera, Eulophidae) are parasitoids that are harmful to Polistes nimpha. Both parasitoids are more present in colony clusters and usually infest larger nests. If there is a large amount of parasitoids, the host colony will become infested earlier. If infestations occur before worker emergence, the host population density can be greatly impacted. Therefore, spatial distributions of the nests, as well as seasonal aspects, affect the colony's development and vulnerability to the parasitoids. Polistes nimpha may coexist with the parasitoids, but this stability depends on annual changes in their life cycles, as well as on the various features of the host habitat, since this can directly affect the intensity of predation. The influence of parasitoids on the overall population of the species depends not only on Polistes nimpha’s defensive behavior, but also on the intra- and interspecific competition of the parasitoids.

== Predators ==
The Polistes nimpha is prey to not only parasitoids, but also to entomophages, such as birds, spiders and the hornet Vespa crabro. Data on ant predation are conflicting. One study considers them to be important natural enemies of Polistes nimpha. Another study claims that ants only raid nests when all adult wasps have died and stopped covering the nest with ant repellent, suggesting that they are more likely to be considered scavengers of the wasp colony. Pleiometrotic colonies are better protected from invertebrate predators, and they can usually rebuild their nests if it is destroyed. The most vulnerable time in the wasp's life cycle is the interval between nest foundation and worker emergence.
