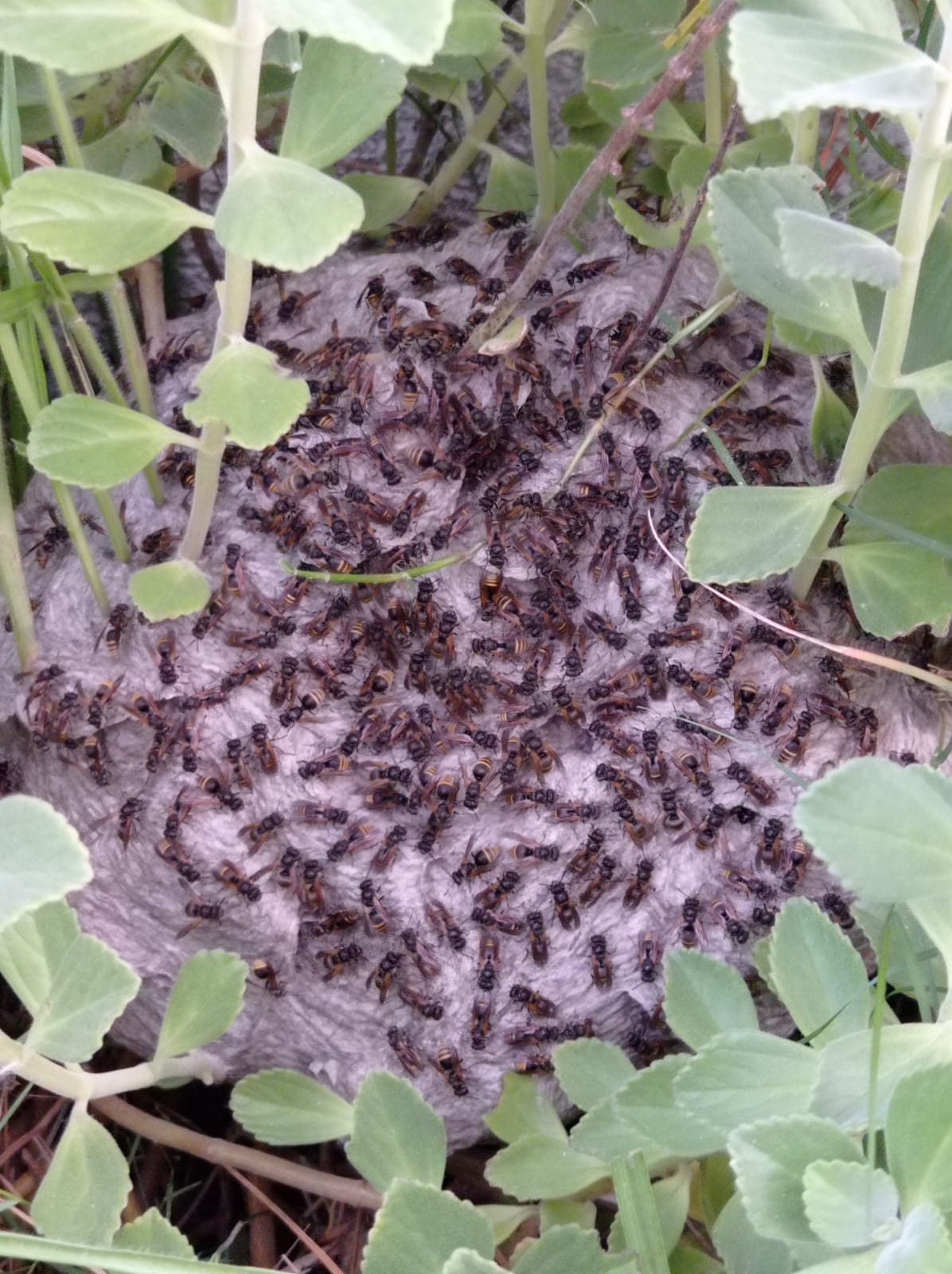

Scientific classification
- Kingdom: Animalia
- Phylum: Arthropoda
- Class: Insecta
- Order: Hymenoptera
- Family: Vespidae
- Subfamily: Polistinae
- Tribe: Epiponini
- Genus: Brachygastra
- Species: B. lecheguana

Binomial name
- Brachygastra lecheguana (Latreille, 1824)

Synonyms
- Vespa sericea Fabricius, 1804; Polistes lecheguana Latreille, 1824; Brachygastra analis Perty, 1833; Vespa lecheguana (Latreille, 1824); Brachygastra velutina Spinola, 1841; Melissaia lecheguana (Latreille, 1824); Brachygastra aurulenta Erichson, 1848; Nectarinia binotata Saussure, 1854; Nectarinia analis Saussure, 1854; Nectarinia velutina (Erichson, 1848); Chartergus sericeus (Fabricius, 1804); Nectarinia sericeus (Fabricius, 1804); Caba lecheguana (Latreille, 1824); Caba analis (Saussure, 1854); Caba binotata (Saussure, 1854)

= Brachygastra lecheguana =

Species of wasp

Brachygastra lecheguana (Latreille, 1824), formerly known as Nectarina lecheguana, is a species of dark paper wasp found across tropical to subtropical America. It nests in underbrush in grassland-type environments, and species of the genus Brachygastra store honey, a trait characteristic of the genus.

== Names ==
Common names include marimbondo-do-campo, marimbondo-do-pasto, marimbondo-exu, marimbondo-de-pote, marimbondo-de-purrão, and avispa-de-pote, among others depending on the location.

It is called tu in the Kwaza language of Rondônia, Brazil.

== Taxonomy ==
B. lecheguana belongs to the Epiponini tribe of Polistinae wasps, sometimes referred to as Polybiinae wasps. It is a Neotropical social wasp species that falls under the genus Brachygastra.

Brachygastra wasps are identified, as noted in Andena and Carpenter (2012), by an anatomical projection over their posterior. The scutellum, metanotum, and propodeum, three of the hymenopteran back structures, combined form a flat, vertical surface in the middle of the body (mesosoma).

B. lecheguana is very closely related to B. mellifica and B. borellii, and indeed some authors suggest that B. lecheguana and B. mellifica can only be differentiated based on where they are found with respect to their reported distribution throughout the Americas. However, there are morphological and genetic differences between these species.

== History of study ==
Brachygastra lecheguana was first described by Pierre André Latreille in 1824. It was originally named Nectarina lecheguana, and the switch from Nectarina to Brachygastra as a name for this genus was not standard in the scientific literature until the 1940s. Between 1824 and 1943, this species was documented as a member of the following genera: Polistes, Vespa, Nectarinia (a misspelling of Nectarina, and a misuse of this genus of birds), Brachygaster (another misspelling, and a misuse of this genus of parasitic wasp), Melissaia, and Caba.

In 1923, Bequeart performed a survey of the literature on this species, compiling accounts and descriptions by entomologists Ferdinand de Saussure, Hermann von Ihering, and du Buysson among numerous others, creating a source of descriptive information on this species. One study has focused on the morphological caste differentiation of B. lecheguana and another directly studied its foraging behavior. While not the focus, B. lecheguana has been included in studies of groups of wasps known to be natural enemies of agricultural pests, and has been documented in a number of papers cataloging flower visitation by insects and birds.

== Description and identification ==
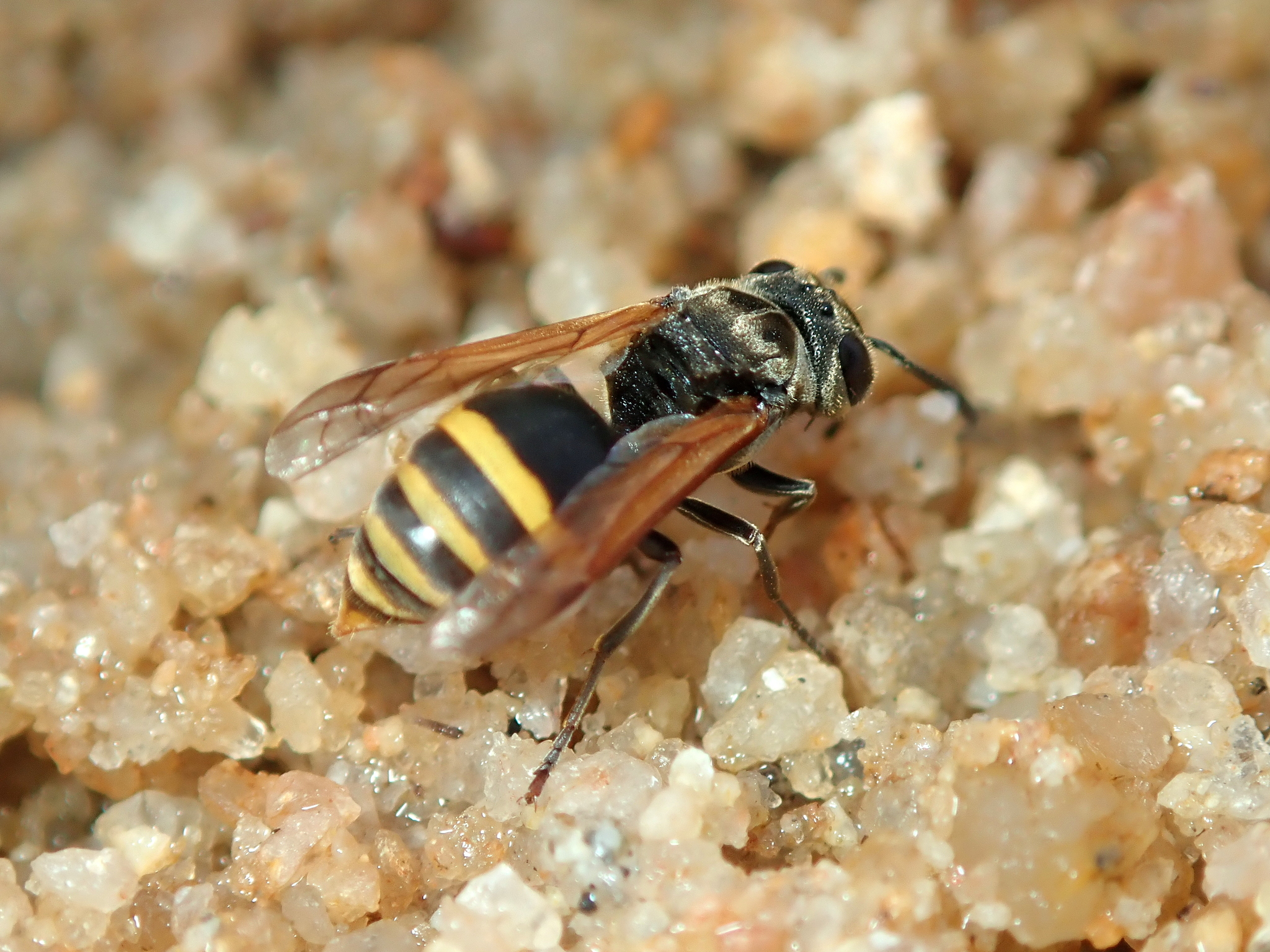
A Brachygastra lecheguana on sand.

Bequaert provides a detailed description of the anatomy and features of B. lecheguana. This species is black, with an abdomen colored with yellow stripes, having patches on the thorax and head colored yellow as well. The abdomen is wide and truncate, and nests are globular, gray, and close to the ground. Queens and workers were recorded to be ~7.5–9 mm long and males ranged from ~7.5–8 mm in length. B. lecheguana can be differentiated from B. mellifica based on the male reproductive anatomy; in B. lecheguana the males have an apically wide digitus while that of B. mellifica males is relatively narrow.

== Distribution and habitat ==
B. lecheguana is found across North and South America, ranging from Mexico to Argentina. This species has been observed a couple times as far north as Texas and Arizona, but tends to be rare north of Mexico.

Nests are oval, about the size of a human head, made of gray paper-like material, and close to the ground. Bequeart includes a lengthy description of the construction process for one of these nests in his 1932 publication on Polybiinae wasps. Nests are located in undergrowth, and it appears that these wasps prefer more temperate locations characterized by open, less humid, grassland environments.

== Colony cycle ==
As a member of the polistine wasp tribe Epiponini, B. lecheguana is a swarm-founding species. Their nests are polygynous, with reproductively active females numbering anywhere from 1% to possibly even 17% of a colony. Reports of the total number of individuals in a given colony have been recorded by a couple different sources ranging from 13800 to 15000, although it appears that a limited number of colony counts are documented in the scientific literature. The male to female ratio was reported as 0 in a colony collected in May, 1:15 in a colony collected in January, and 1:1 in a colony observed in the fall.

Nests are recorded to be perennial, often lasting several years. New colonies are formed in the spring when several fertile queens, accompanied by a few worker wasps in a swarm, establish new nest sites.

== Caste differences ==
In a study that characterized the morphological difference between different castes in B. lecheguana, researchers used ovary development to classify individuals as workers, queens, or "intermediates". Workers had either undeveloped or slightly developed ovaries, and constituted around 39% of the study's pool of individuals, while queens, with well developed ovaries containing 6-12 oocytes, accounted for around 0.7% of the individuals. A third group, with moderately developed ovaries containing 1-5 oocytes, was identified as an intermediate caste and accounted for around 60.3% of the colony. While the ovaries belonging to queen individuals had evidence of insemination, there was no detectable sperm in the reproductive organs of the intermediate individuals.

Anecdotal accounts of B. lecheguana nests suggest that queens are larger than workers. However it appears that a more careful statistical analysis indicates that there is no overall size difference between queens, workers, or intermediates. There is no difference in overall size, but the queens have a set of anatomical proportions distinct from the intermediates and workers, smaller in some structures and larger in others.

While it appears that caste might be discernible through ovary development, the absence of morphological differences between individuals in B. lecheguana suggests that there is no meaningful morphological caste. However it is clear that individuals can be designated reproductives and nonreproductives.

== Mimicry ==
Bequaert describes the extensive color and shape similarities between B. lecheguana and a number of other species with the word "homeochromic" instead of "mimic". He lists a number of vespid wasps and potter wasps belonging to the genera Pachodynerus, Odynerus, and Ancistrocerus, and several crabronid wasps of the genera Gorytes and Cerceris. Along with wasps, there are several bee species that are homeochromic, including mason bees of the genera Megachile, Anthidiellum, Hypanthidium, Dianthidium, and the species Stelis costaricensis, cuckoo bees belonging to the genus Epeolus, stingless Trigona bees, and sweat bees from the genus Halictus. He also lists a soldier fly of the genus Stratiomys as a homeochromic species.

While B. lecheguana, Bequaert suggests, is the most abundant in this group of homeochromic species, he does not make the claim that these similarities arose from mimicry in the classic sense, but he suggests that further research would be helpful.

== Diet ==
=== Nectar ===
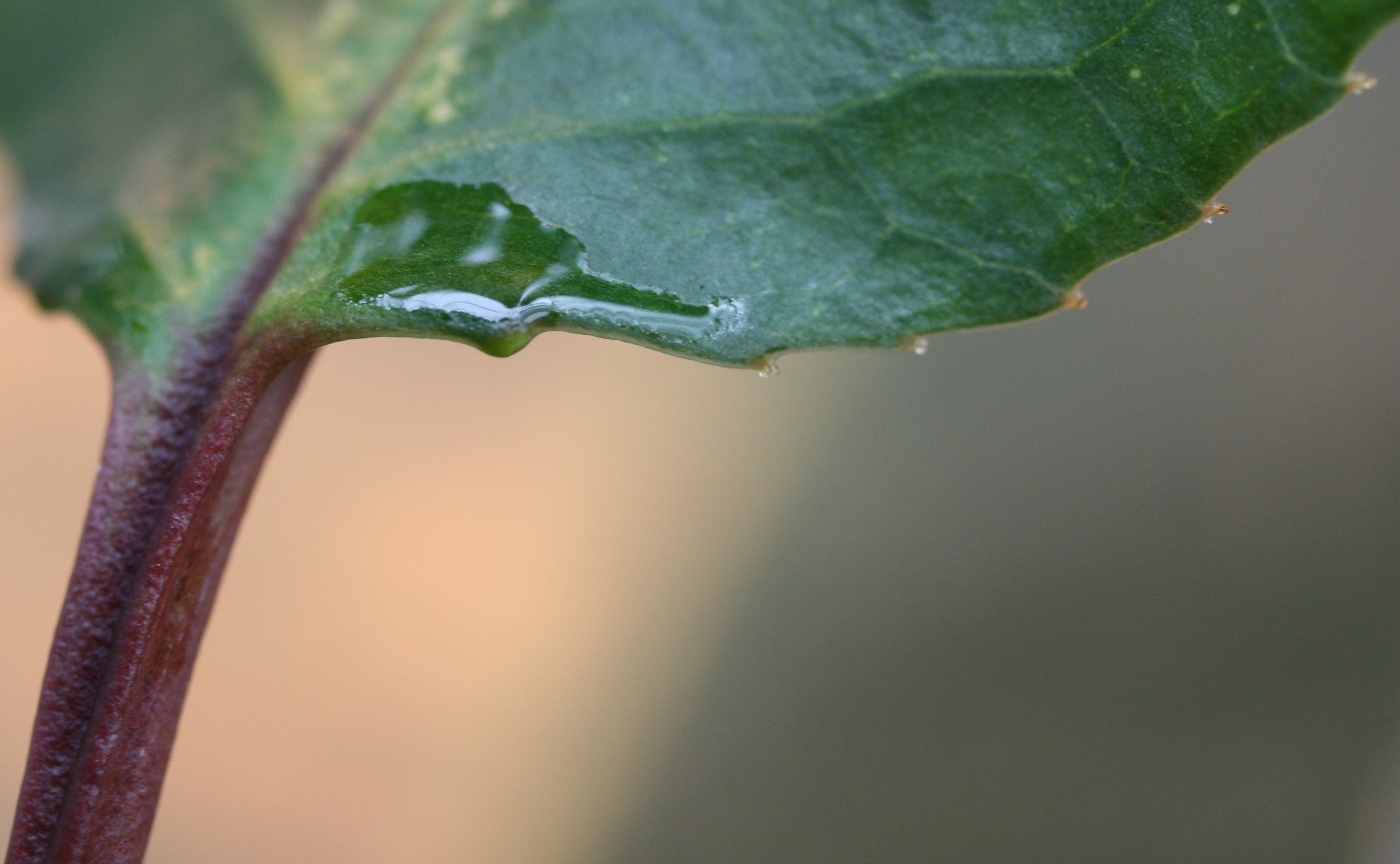
Similar to B. malifolia, the plant Prunus africana has extrafloral nectaries. B. lecheguana is known to visit the nectaries on B. malifolia and to compete with ants for the resource.

B. lecheguana is known to visit a number of plants to obtain nectar resources. This wasp has been documented visiting the flowers of Baccharis spp., Erythrina crista-galli, Ziziphus cotinifolia, Solanum paniculatum, Sidastrum paniculatum, and Erythroxylon catingae and more. In addition to obtaining nectar from flowers, B. lecheguana has been reported as a visitor of extrafloral nectaries on such species as Banisteriopsis malifolia.

=== Predation ===
This wasp does not rely solely on nectar for food; it is a well-documented predator of a number of different arthropod species. Among its prey are beetles of the genus Anthonomus and the coffee leaf miner Leucoptera coffeella. It is known to forage on a number of plant species including Eugenia uniflora fruits, Banisteriopsis malifolia, and several agriculturally relevant plants.

== Species interactions ==
=== Competition ===
This species has been documented to compete for food resources with several other animal species. B. lecheguana competes with the ant species Camponotus blandus for the plant Banisteriopsis maliflora, and, consequently, the wasp is typically found on ant-free plants and has been known to interrupt its foraging when an ant approaches. This supports the hypothesis that B. lecheguana is in a mutualistic relationship with the plant B. maliflora, since the plant supplies nectar reserves to the wasp, and the wasp preys on herbivorous insect larvae living on the plant.

Another study suggests that B. lecheguana may also compete with parasitoids for coffee leaf miner larvae in an agricultural setting.

=== Pollination ===
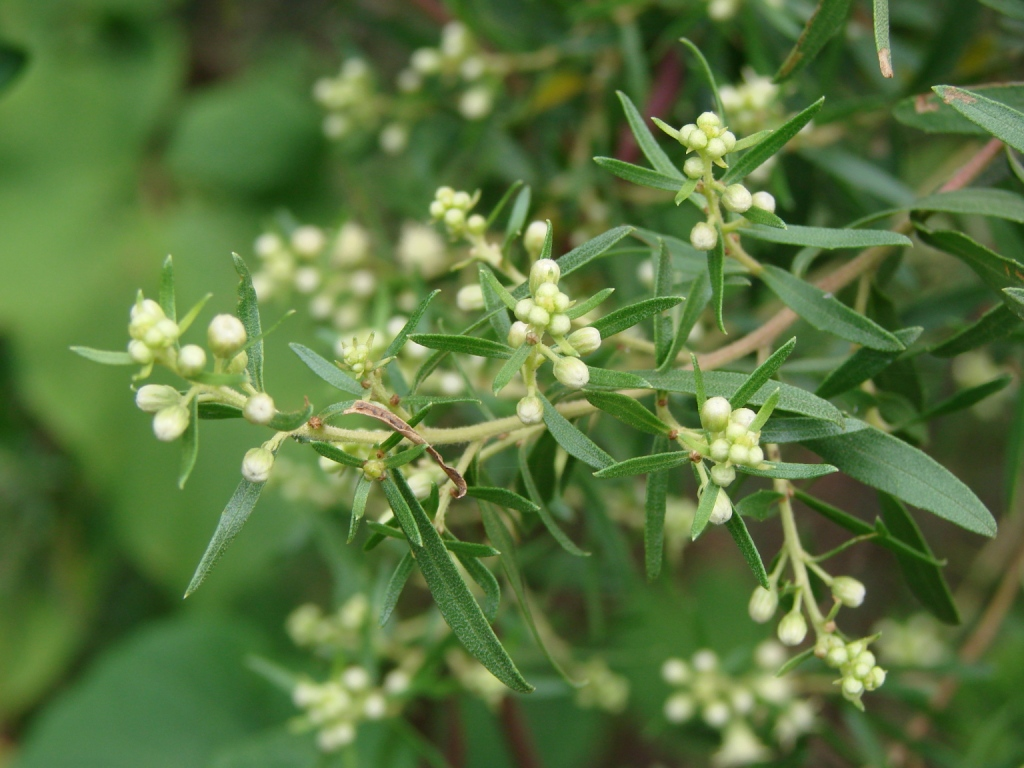
Baccharis dracunculifolia is a species of Baccharis from Brazil. B. lecheguana is known to pollinate various members of this genus.

Although this wasp visits a diverse collection of flowering plants, it is only reported as a pollinator in a limited number of instances. B. lecheguana is documented as a pollinator of Baccharis spp. Additionally, as an alien species to the Galápagos Islands, there have been reports that catalog B. lecheguana as an important pollinator on the island of Santa Cruz.

=== Parasites ===
The limited information on this species documents very few instances of parasitism, although it is unlikely that this wasp is free from parasites. One report suggests that B. lecheguana is subject to parasitism by Strepsiptera.

=== Predators ===
B. lecheguana is a prey target for a number of animals. The lizard Tupinambis teguixin is known to prey on this wasp, having easy access to its nests since they are low to the ground and easily accessible. A number of birds are suspected to prey on B. lecheguana, although there are relatively few documentations of this in the literature. Also, the army ant Eciton dulcius is reported to prey on this wasp. Another source of predation is by asilids, or robber flies.

== Human interactions ==
=== Agriculture ===
Chlorpyrifos is an organophosphate pesticide that has been shown to have high mortality in several biological pest control species such as B. lecheguana.

B. lecheguana is a known natural enemy of the coffee leaf miner Leucoptera coffeella, along with several other species of wasp including Polistes versicolor, Polybia paulista, Polybia occidentalis, Polybia scutellaris, and Protonectarina sylveirae. B. lecheguana are often used as biological controls in coffee plantations in order to prevent the proliferation of the devastating leaf miner. In order to test the effect pesticides have on the environment and to test the efficacy of using pesticides in conjunction with natural predators, the effect that several pesticides have on the health of B. lecheguana and other wasps was assayed. This wasp species is found to be highly susceptible to chlorpyrifos and other organophosphate pesticides. Even at half the recommended dosage of a number of these pesticides, the wasp was found to have nearly 100% mortality.

In addition to coffee plantations, wasps have also been documented to forage in cashew farms and inhabit eucalyptus plantations where it may play a role in pest control.

=== Stings and aggressiveness ===
The aggressiveness of this wasp is disputed. While some report that the wasp is rather unaggressive even when disturbed, others warn of its aggressive behavior towards human victims. Having a moderately painful sting, B. lecheguana uses an autotomous stinging strategy, employing a barbed stinger specialized for venom delivery and release of the stinger in the sting site.

=== Honey ===
Some sources indicate that the honey from the B. lecheguana hives is harvested regularly and consumed. In certain parts of Mexico, it appears that B. lecheguana is maintained in a state of semi-domestication. It is warned, however, that the honey can also be poisonous. The toxicity of the honey is a result of the wasp collecting nectar during the Datura blooming season.

=== Medicine ===
Ethnoentomologists and anthropologists have documented use of B. lecheguana as a medical treatment in certain communities. Some of the communities eat both the honey and the larvae of the wasp, while others use the adult wasps themselves. It appears that the honey has been used to treat coughing or asthma in the Pankararé and Matinha communities in Brazil. The wasp itself has been used in the Serrinha area to treat pain associated with their stings.
