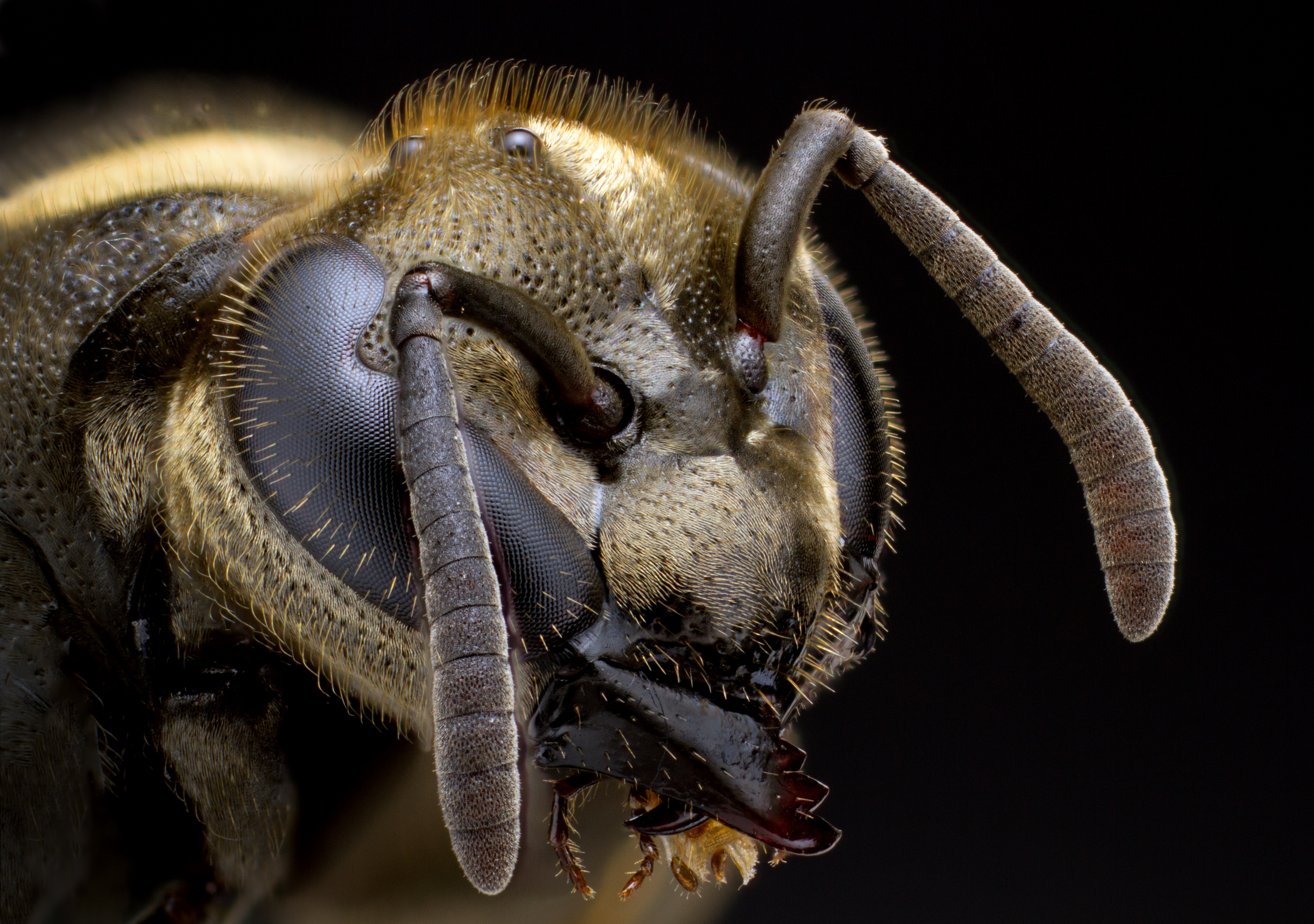
- Brachygastra mellifica

Scientific classification
- Kingdom: Animalia
- Phylum: Arthropoda
- Clade: Pancrustacea
- Class: Insecta
- Order: Hymenoptera
- Family: Vespidae
- Tribe: Epiponini
- Genus: Brachygastra; Perty, 1833

Type species
- Brachygastra lecheguana (Latreille, 1824)

Species
- 17 species

= Brachygastra =

Genus of wasps

Honey wasps are species in the genus Brachygastra (from Ancient Greek βραχύς (brakhús), meaning "short", and γαστήρ (gastḗr), meaning "belly") of the family Vespidae. Brachygastra comprises 17 species of social paper wasps. The ancestral species are thought to have diverged about 32 million years ago within diverse Amazon rainforest. Subsequent speciation within the genus is thought to have mostly occurred between 23 Ma and 10 Ma, during the time of the Andean uplift when the landscape was significantly altered due to tectonic activity. The current cladistic organisation of the genus has been heavily reliant on morphological characteristics.

Brachygastra species live in colonies and construct arboreal paper nests in humid forest environments, although several species occur in open vegetation. They are widely distributed in Central and South America, and also occur in southwest areas of North America. They have a broad diet consisting of floral nectar and insect protein. Several species are known to collect and store nectar in large amounts as honey, a characteristic in the insect world only shared with various bee species, a few wasp species (Polybia spp.), and a few ant species (Myrmecocystus spp. and other genera). There are few historical reports of humans using honey produced by honey wasps, probably due to its small quantities and the wasp's fierce sting.

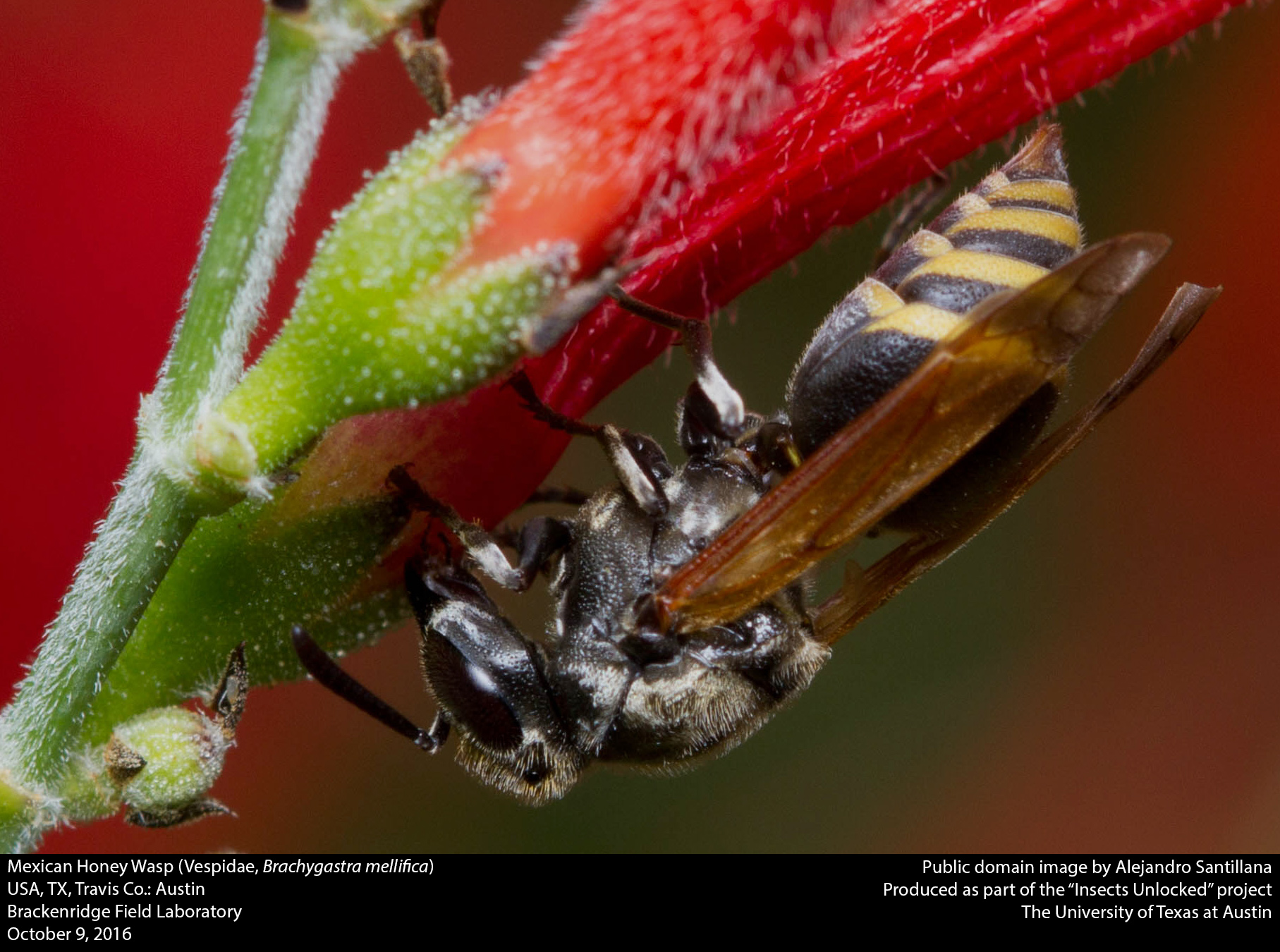
Mexican Honey Wasp (Vespidae, Brachygastra mellifica)

The species can provide important ecosystem services such as pollination, herbivore deterrence and predation of disease vectors.

== Taxonomy ==
Upon its introduction by Perty in 1833, the name Brachygastra was confused with the genus Brachygaster within the family Evaniidae. It was later changed to Nectarina, only to be confused with the genus of birds Nectarinia. Misspellings in publications further compounded the confusion.

== Phylogeny ==
In 1991 Carpenter placed Brachygastra in a sister group of Chartergus based on morphological data. In 1993 Wenzel revised this and placed Brachygastra in a sister genus of Protonectarina + Polybia based on nest architecture. Then, in 1994 Carpenter and Wenzel worked together, taking into account a combination of characteristics including adult morphology, nest architecture and larval morphology, and Brachygastra, again, was sister of Chartergus. In 2004 whilst investigating the phylogeny of Epiponini, Noll et al. used discretised morphometric measurements of caste differentiation to reinforced the relationship between Brachygastra and Chartergus. Since then both Arevalo et al. (2004) and Pickett and Carpenter (2010) have placed Brachygastra as a sister genus of Protonectarina after analysing molecular, morphological and behavioural data, however, both groups did not include Chartergus.

=== Groups within Brachygastra ===
Brachygastra azteca is considered to be the most basal species, and a sister species to all others in the genus. The rest of the genus Brachygastra has historically been divided into two main groups consisting of closely related species. The lecheguana group consists of B. mellifica, B. lecheguana, and B. borellii, and the smithii group of B. baccalaurea, B. bilineolata, B. smithii, B. propodealis, and B. buyssoni. The scutellaris group, containting B. augusti, B. mouleae, B. fistulosa, B. cooperi, B. myseri and B. scutellaris, is composed of the remaining species that are apparently less closely related and not able to be placed in either of the previous groups. These three groups are bound within a clade by shared characteristics of the scutellum. It is strongly angular, projects over the metanotum and is medially emarginated, usually in a V-shape.

==== The lecheguana group ====
Initially the lechuguana group was thought to be one species named B. lecheguana, but in 1968, Naumann was able to discern the different species by looking at male features, giving rise to B. borellii and B. mellifica. B. lecheguana and B. mellifica can only be separated by male genitalia features whilst B. borellii has distinct long hairs and deep punctation on the head and on the mesosoma.

==== The smithii group ====
The three basal most species of the smithii group, B. bilineolata, B. moebiana, and B. smithii have a complex taxonomic history due to their morphological similarities and variations of colour patterns. B. smithii and B. moebiana were initially thought to be varieties of B. bilineolata based on colour pattern. In 1968 Naumann elevated B. bilineolata and B. smithii to species level but still considered B. moebiana as a variety of B. bilineolata. Since then the occipital carina has been used to separate these species and establish B, bilineolata as the most basal species of the smithii group.

==== The scutellaris group ====
The scutellaris group is composed of the remaining species that do not appear to be closely related and therefore do not fit into the lechuguana or smithii groups.

== Distribution ==
The Neotropical realm covers Central and South America

The species of the genus Brachygastra are a common component of neotropical social wasp fauna. The genus is broadly distributed throughout Central and South America, absent only from Chile, Uruguay and central and south Argentina. One species, B. mellifica, occurs in southwest United States, in Texas and Arizona.

== Habitat ==
Humid and forested environments are typical habitat for these wasps, although B. augusti, B. mouleae, B. moebiana and B. lecheguana can inhabit areas with open vegetation. Two species, B. borellii and B. baccaraulea, live in upland areas. The lecheguana group occurs in the Atlantic rainforest and Nearctic region, the scutellaris group lives mostly in the Atlantic forest and the smithii group is confined to the Amazon rainforest. Finally, B. azteca, a sister species to all other species of the genus, occurs in Mexico.

== Evolution ==
The original diversification of Brachygastra probably began about 32 Ma. At that time diverse Amazonian rainforest extended all the way to the Caribbean coast of South America. The Greater Antilles and Aves Ridge land bridge, GAARlandia preceded the formation of the Isthmus of Panama and is thought to have connected the Nearctic and Neotropics, allowing the ancestor of the lecheguana and azteca group to disperse between North, Central and South America.

From 23 to 10 Ma, the Andean uplift accelerated and rapidly changed the Amazonian landscape, with the formation of the vast network of lakes, swamps and wetlands called the Pebas system. It grew to approximately 1 million km^{2} in the northern portion of South America, working to separate populations of ancestral Brachygastra.

Fossils of social wasps are rare in the fossil record, probably due to behavioural characteristics and paper nest structures that do not lend themselves to fossilisation.

== Morphology ==
Species are easily recognised by the very high scutellum that often projects over the metanotum. The metanotum and propodeum forms a flat, vertical posterior surface of the mesosoma. The abdomen is often described as truncate due to being wider than it is long (and the genus name means “short-bellied”). Variation in the size and density of punctures on different parts of the body has been used to describe and identify species, subspecies, and forms of the genus. There are obvious morphological caste differences in many species with queens being larger than workers. Additionally, larger queens are generally more fecund and dominant that smaller counterparts. Studies on morphological caste differences have been reported for B. augusti, B. bilineolata, B. lecheguana, B. moebiana, B. myersi and B. scutellaris.

== Nests ==
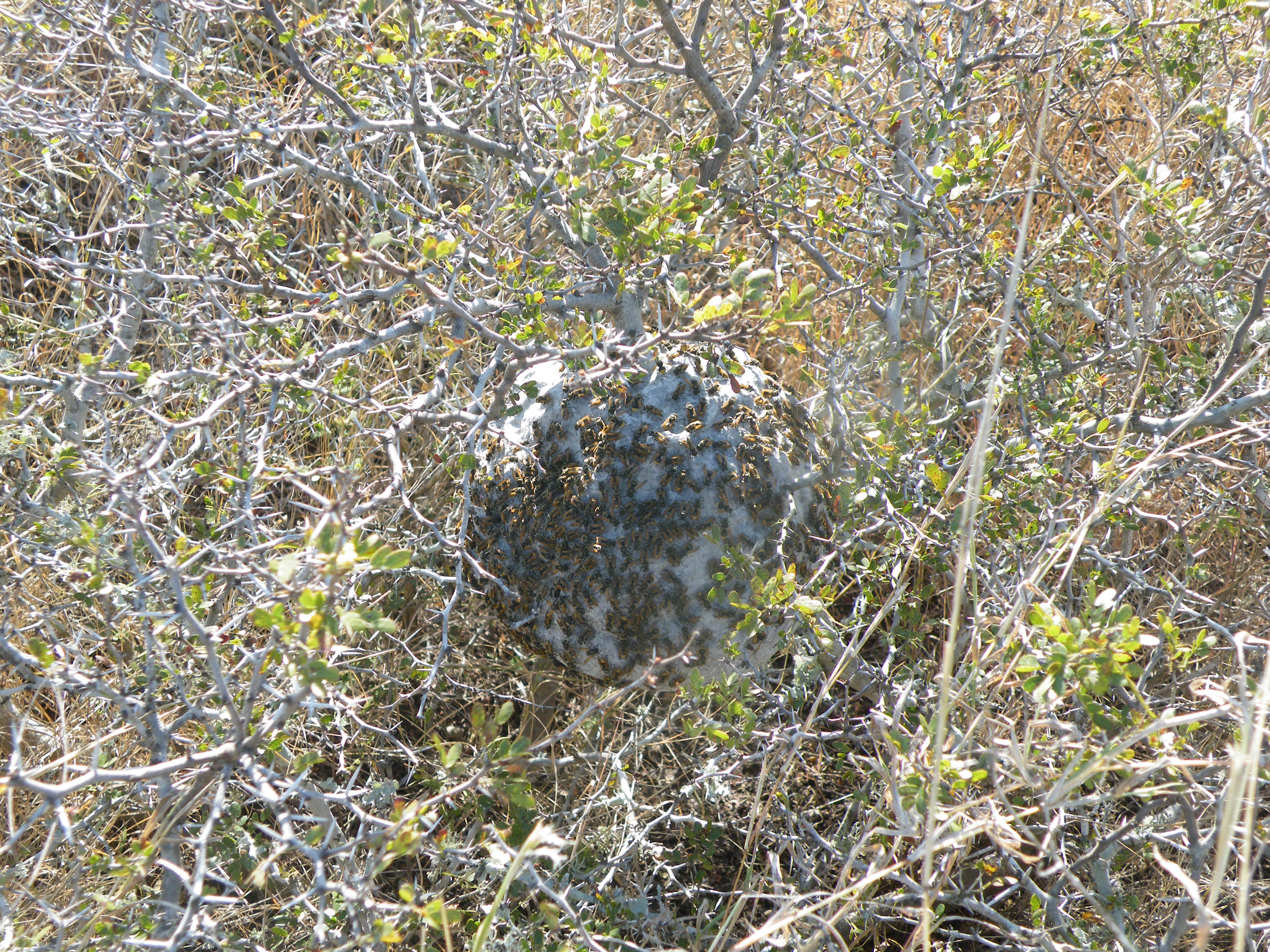
Brachygastra mellifica nest in a tree

Nests are always arboreal and sessile. They are made with various plant material consisting of minute chips and long fibres that are chewed and compacted into a paper like material. They are usually a brown or grey colour with a brittle texture. The entrances vary from circular holes or slits, sometimes with multiple entrances arranged chaotically. The primary comb is planar or spherical and is usually constructed in a spiral sequence. Nests can contain thousands of individuals and range in size depending on species and colony age or health.

== Diet and foraging ==
The diet of Honey wasps is made up of carbohydrates from nectar and honey, and protein attained from predation upon various insects such as beetles, weevils, lepidopterans, aphids and various larvae. They have a wide feeding flexibility, probably due to the seasonal availability floral nectar and insect prey. Floral nectar and insect protein are both stored within the comb of the nest. Brachygastra mellifica and B. lecheguana are well known for their large stores of nectar. B. azteca also stores nectar but in smaller quantities. In addition to nectar, species often collect honeydew from honey-dew producing cercopids and nymphal membracids.

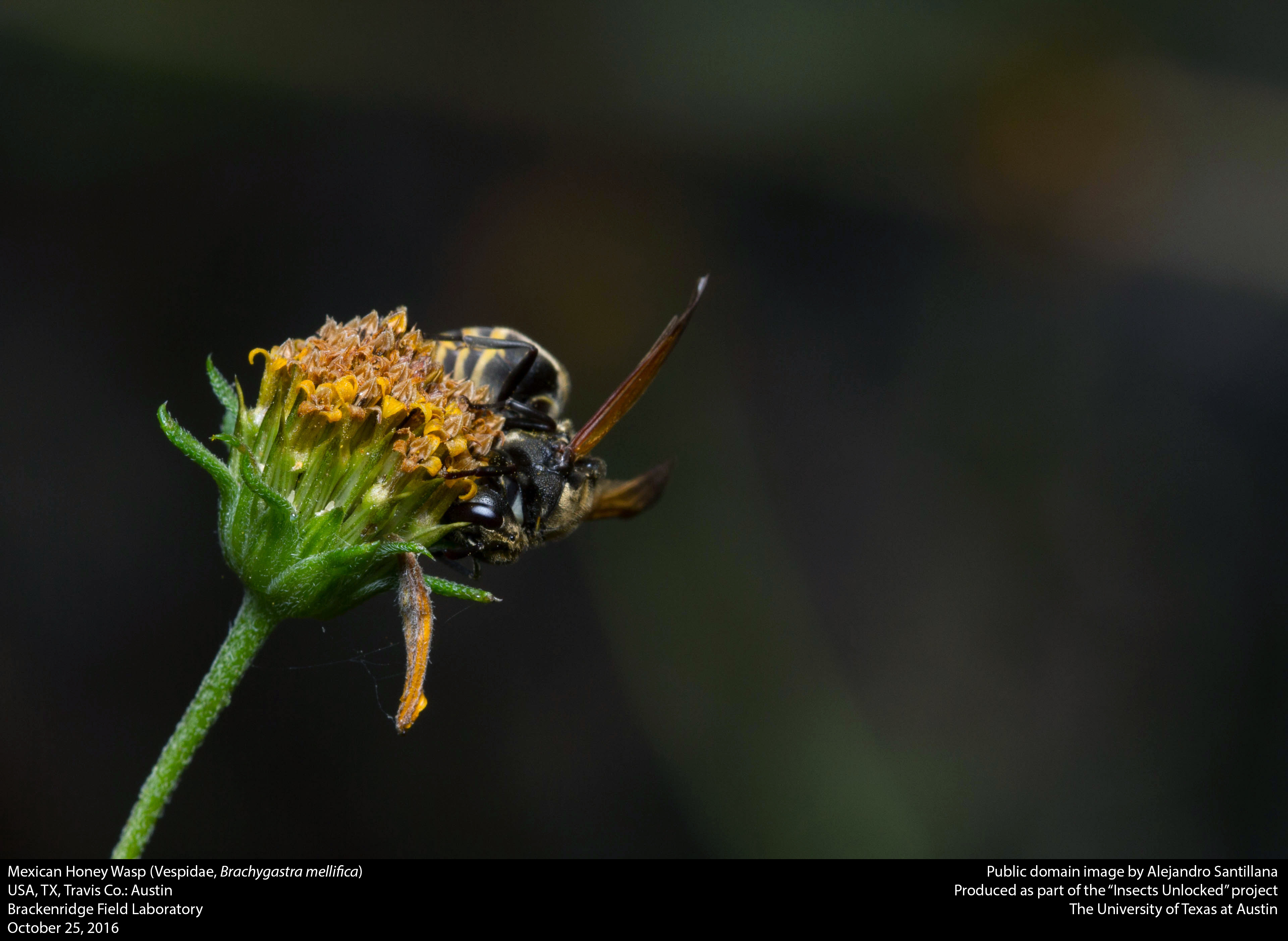
Mexican Honey Wasp (Vespidae, Brachygastra mellifica) collecting nectar from a flower

== Ecosystem services ==
The nectar gathering activity of these wasp species allows them to provide pollination services to some plant types, such as myrtaceae in the Cerrado, sunflower (Helianthus annuus L., Asteraceae) and mesquite in the Lower Rio Grande Valley of Texas and Avocado. Additionally, honey wasps benefit some plant species by preying upon endophytic herbivorous insects. Damaged plants release volatile compounds that act as chemical and olfactory cues for predatory Brachygastra species, attracting them to the source of the grazing herbivorous insect. They have been observed attacking many insect pest species such as Asian citrus psyllid (Diaphorina citri), tomato leafminer (Tuta absoluta), cotton boll weevil larvae (Anthonomus grandis), and the white coffee leaf miner larvae (Perileucoptera coffeella), suggesting that they have potential to be used as a biological control agent for human crops.

== Predators ==
Spiders commonly catch individual wasps in their webs. Opossums and woodpeckers have been observed attacking entire nests.

== Conservation ==
Conservation of these wasps species is important to allow them to continue providing ecosystem services. Conservation practices include the protection of wasp nests, the maintenance of floral diversity, the preservation of forests and the use of pest control methods that do not harm these wasps.

== Selected species ==
- Brachygastra lecheguana
- Brachygastra mellifica
