= Unxia =

Unxia is the scientific name of two genera of organisms and may refer to:

- Unxia (beetle), a genus of insects in the family Cerambycidae
- Unxia (plant), a genus of insects in the family Asteraceae
