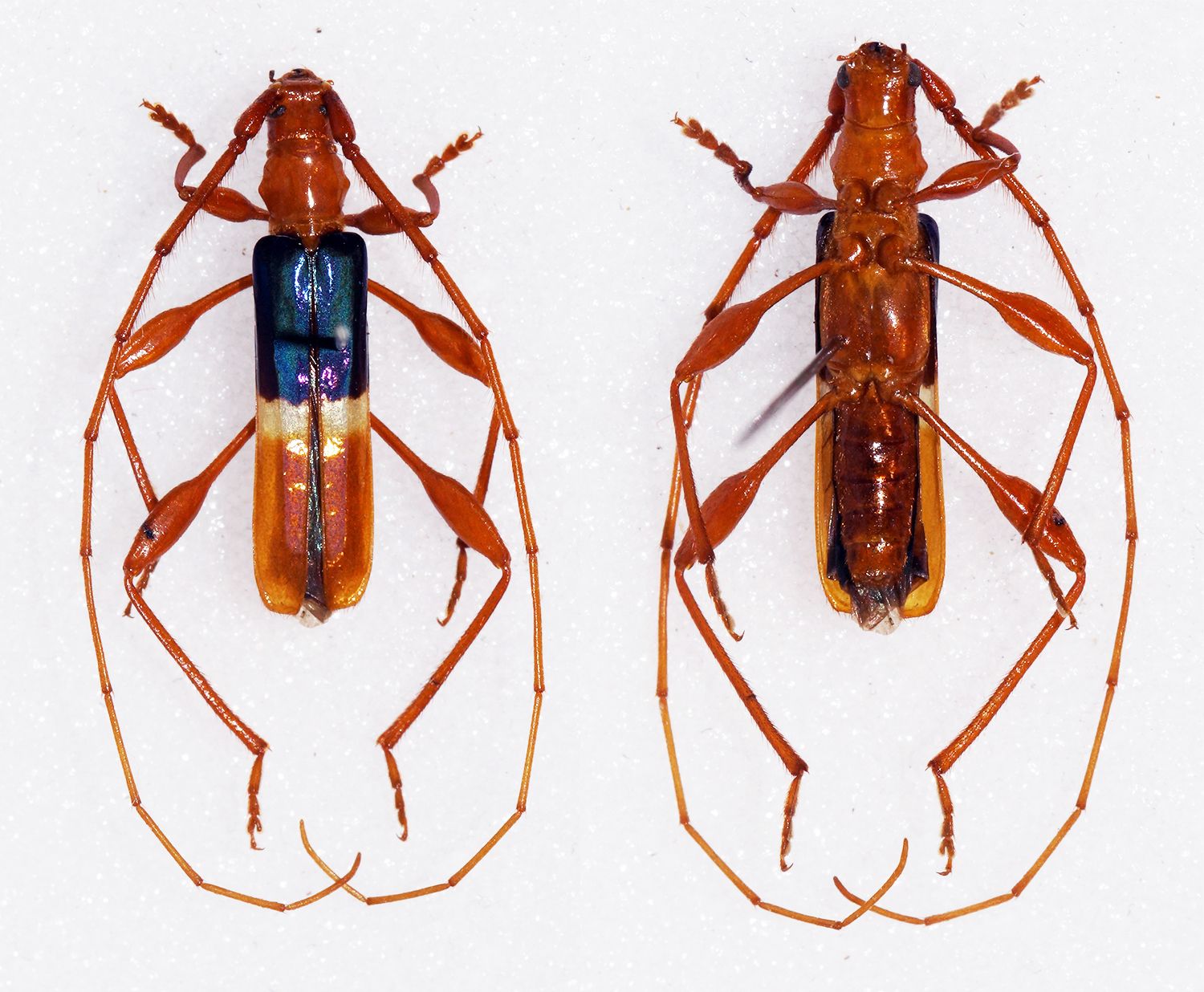
- Chenoderus

Scientific classification
- Kingdom: Animalia
- Phylum: Arthropoda
- Class: Insecta
- Order: Coleoptera
- Suborder: Polyphaga
- Infraorder: Cucujiformia
- Family: Cerambycidae
- Subfamily: Cerambycinae
- Tribe: Unxiini; Napp, 2007

= Unxiini =

Tribe of beetles

Unxiini is a tribe of beetles in the subfamily Cerambycinae, found in South America.

The following genera belong to this tribe:

- Allopeba Napp & Reynaud, 1999
- Chariergus Thomson, 1860
- Chenoderus Fairmaire & Germain, 1859
- Ethemon Thomson, 1864
- Paromoeocerus Gounelle, 1910
- Parunxia Napp, 1977
- Rierguscha Viana, 1970
- Unxia Thomson, 1860
