= Allopeba =

Scientific classification
- Kingdom: Animalia
- Phylum: Arthropoda
- Class: Insecta
- Order: Coleoptera
- Suborder: Polyphaga
- Infraorder: Cucujiformia
- Family: Cerambycidae
- Subfamily: Cerambycinae
- Tribe: Unxiini
- Genus: Allopeba; Napp & Reynaud, 1999

Genus of beetles

Allopeba is a genus of beetles in the family Cerambycidae, containing the following species:

- Allopeba paranaensis (Napp & Reynaud, 1998)
- Allopeba quadripunctatus (Lucas, 1857)
- Allopeba signaticornis (Lucas, 1857)
