= Paromoeocerus stictonotus =

Scientific classification
- Kingdom: Animalia
- Phylum: Arthropoda
- Class: Insecta
- Order: Coleoptera
- Suborder: Polyphaga
- Infraorder: Cucujiformia
- Family: Cerambycidae
- Genus: Paromoeocerus
- Species: P. stictonotus

Binomial name
- Paromoeocerus stictonotus Napp, 1976

Species of beetle

Paromoeocerus stictonotus is a species of beetle in the family Cerambycidae. It was described by Napp in 1976.
