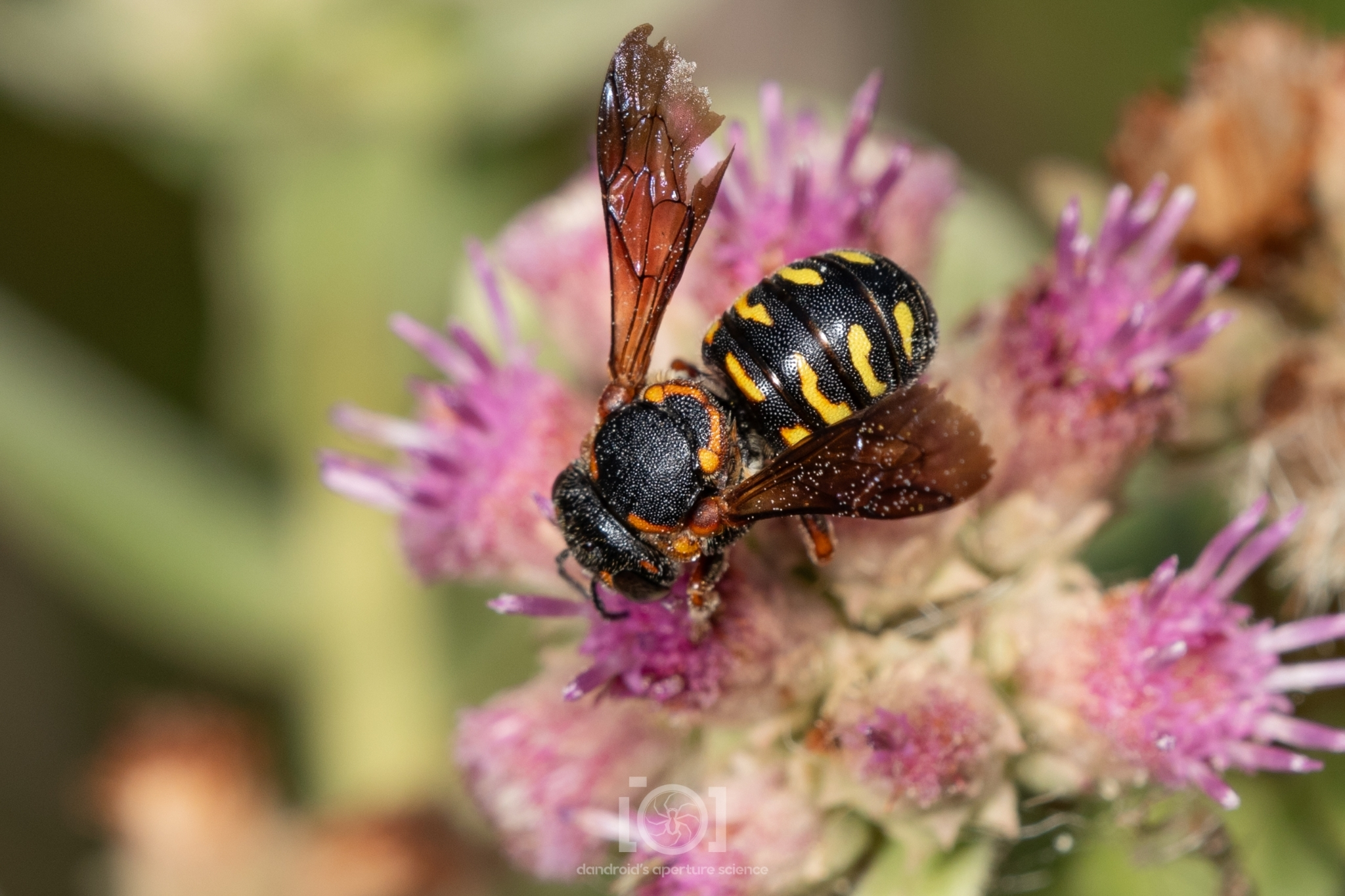

Scientific classification
- Domain: Eukaryota
- Kingdom: Animalia
- Phylum: Arthropoda
- Class: Insecta
- Order: Hymenoptera
- Family: Megachilidae
- Genus: Dianthidium
- Species: D. curvatum

Binomial name
- Dianthidium curvatum (Smith, 1854)

= Dianthidium curvatum =

Species of bee

Dianthidium curvatum is a species of bee in the family Megachilidae. It is found in North America.

== Subspecies ==
These three subspecies belong to the species Dianthidium curvatum:

- Dianthidium curvatum curvatum (Smith, 1854)
- Dianthidium curvatum sayi Cockerell, 1907
- Dianthidium curvatum xerophilum Cockerell, 1907
