= Chenoderus testaceus =

- Chenoderus testaceus in Valdivia, Chile

Scientific classification
- Kingdom: Animalia
- Phylum: Arthropoda
- Clade: Pancrustacea
- Class: Insecta
- Order: Coleoptera
- Suborder: Polyphaga
- Infraorder: Cucujiformia
- Family: Cerambycidae
- Genus: Chenoderus
- Species: C. testaceus

Binomial name
- Chenoderus testaceus (Blanchard in Gay, 1851)

Species of beetle

Chenoderus testaceus is a species of beetle in the family Cerambycidae. It was described by Blanchard in 1851.
