= Allopeba quadripunctatus =

Scientific classification
- Kingdom: Animalia
- Phylum: Arthropoda
- Class: Insecta
- Order: Coleoptera
- Suborder: Polyphaga
- Infraorder: Cucujiformia
- Family: Cerambycidae
- Genus: Allopeba
- Species: A. quadripunctatus

Binomial name
- Allopeba quadripunctatus (H. Lucas, 1857)

Species of beetle

Allopeba quadripunctatus is a species of beetle in the family Cerambycidae. It was described by Hippolyte Lucas in 1857.
