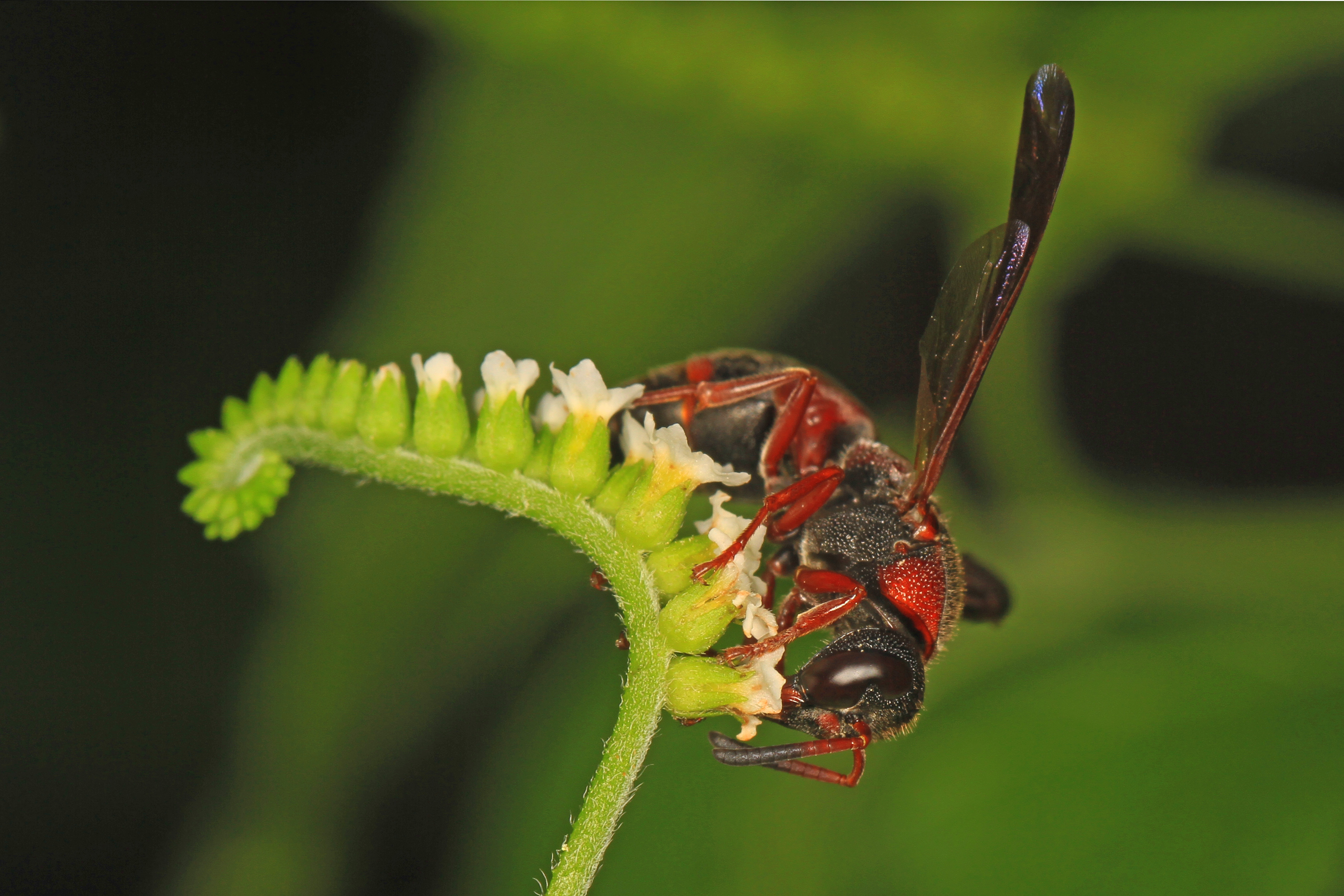

Scientific classification
- Kingdom: Animalia
- Phylum: Arthropoda
- Class: Insecta
- Order: Hymenoptera
- Family: Vespidae
- Genus: Pachodynerus
- Species: P. erynnis

Binomial name
- Pachodynerus erynnis (Lepeletier, 1841)

= Pachodynerus erynnis =

Species of wasp

Pachodynerus erynnis, known generally as the red-marked pachodynerus or red and black mason wasp, is a species of stinging wasp in the family Vespidae.

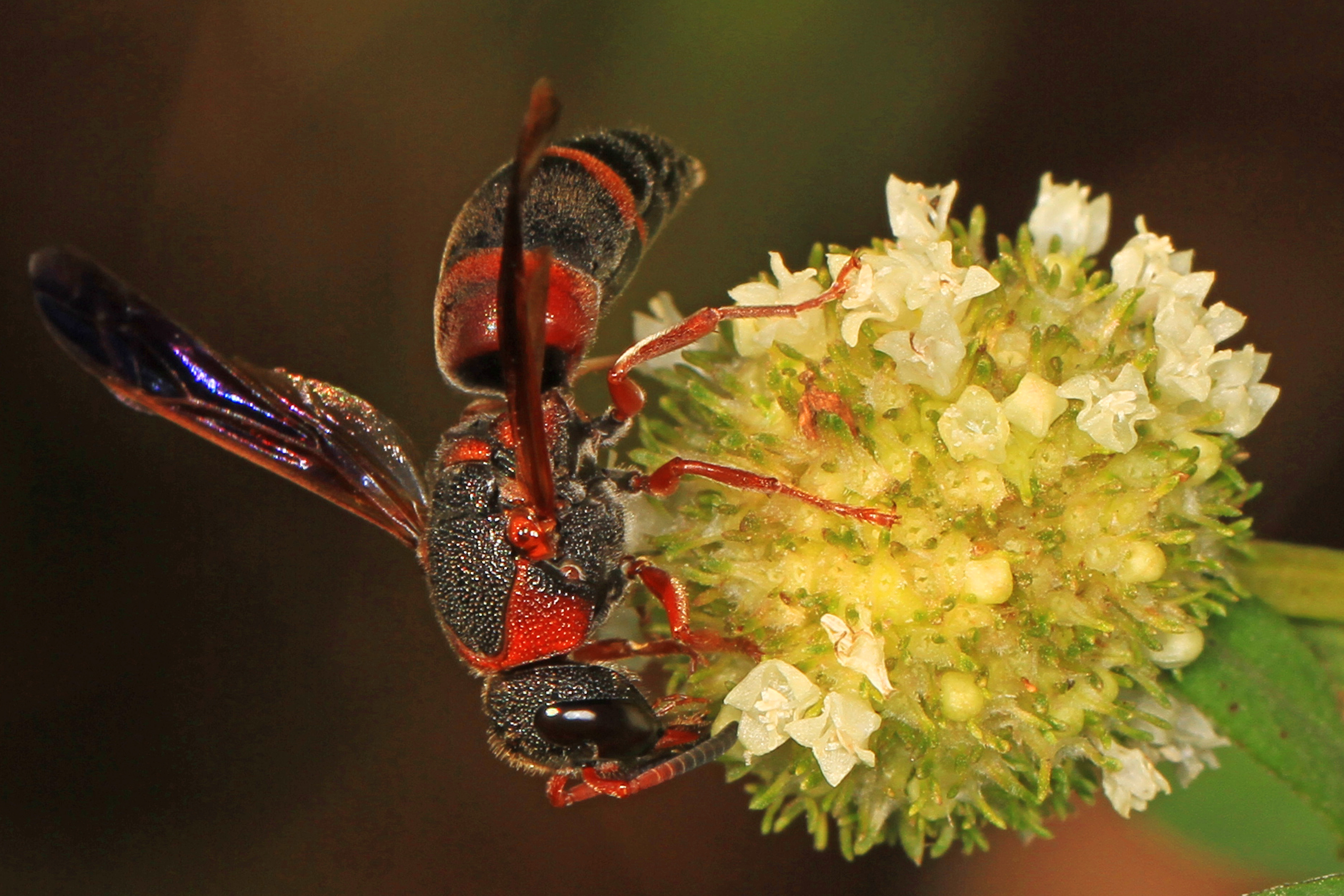
Red-marked pachodynerus, Pachodynerus erynnis

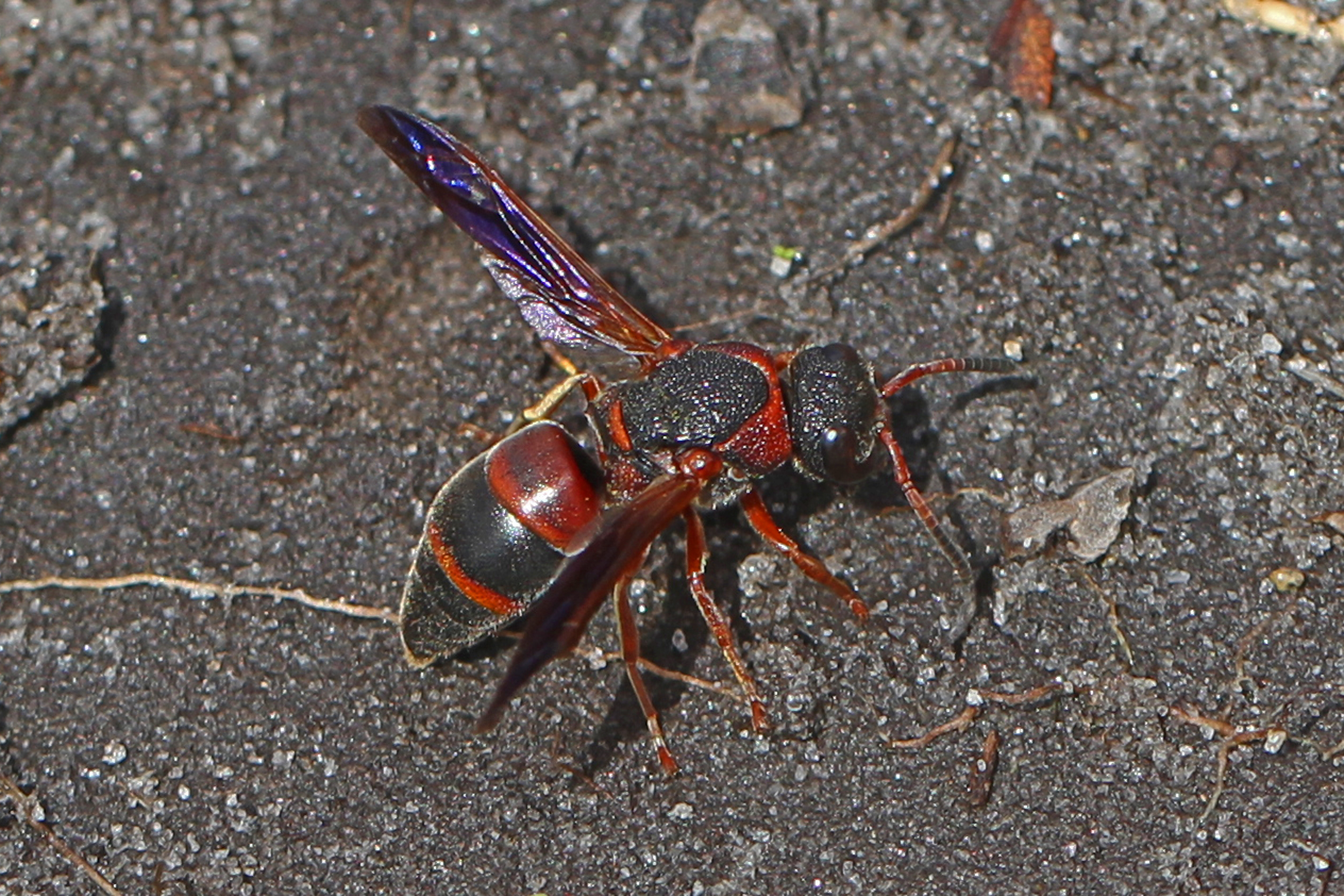
Red-marked pachodynerus, Pachodynerus erynnis
