= Paromoeocerus vestitus =

Scientific classification
- Kingdom: Animalia
- Phylum: Arthropoda
- Class: Insecta
- Order: Coleoptera
- Suborder: Polyphaga
- Infraorder: Cucujiformia
- Family: Cerambycidae
- Genus: Paromoeocerus
- Species: P. vestitus

Binomial name
- Paromoeocerus vestitus Gounelle, 1910

Species of beetle

Paromoeocerus vestitus is a species of beetle in the family Cerambycidae. It was described by Gounelle in 1910.
