= Paromoeocerus notabilis =

Scientific classification
- Kingdom: Animalia
- Phylum: Arthropoda
- Class: Insecta
- Order: Coleoptera
- Suborder: Polyphaga
- Infraorder: Cucujiformia
- Family: Cerambycidae
- Genus: Paromoeocerus
- Species: P. notabilis

Binomial name
- Paromoeocerus notabilis Melzer, 1918

Species of beetle

Paromoeocerus notabilis is a species of beetle in the family Cerambycidae. It was described by Melzer in 1918.
