= Ethemon basirufum =

Scientific classification
- Kingdom: Animalia
- Phylum: Arthropoda
- Class: Insecta
- Order: Coleoptera
- Suborder: Polyphaga
- Infraorder: Cucujiformia
- Family: Cerambycidae
- Genus: Ethemon
- Species: E. basirufum

Binomial name
- Ethemon basirufum Napp, 1979

Species of beetle

Ethemon basirufum is a species of beetle in the family Cerambycidae. It was described by Napp in 1979.
