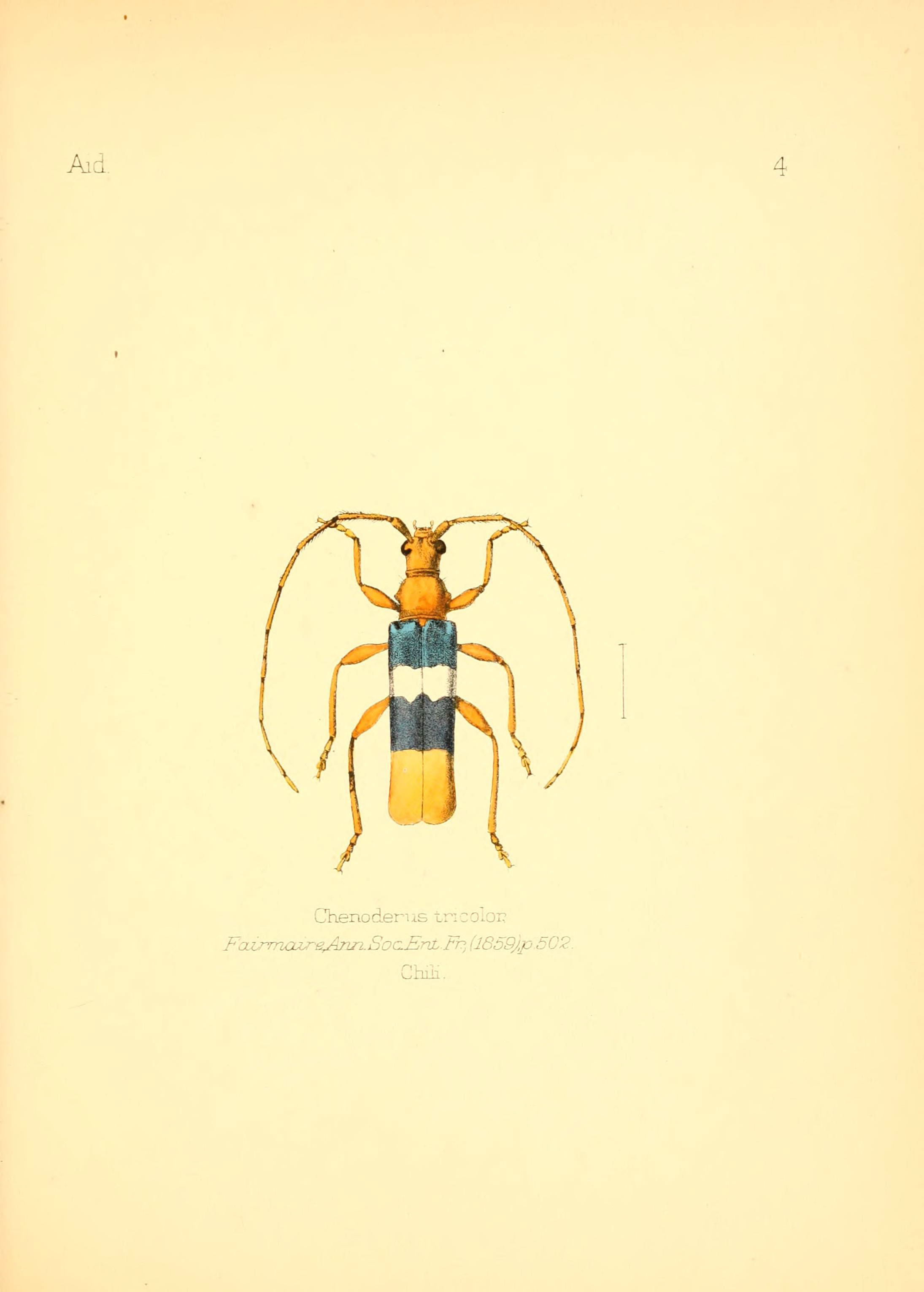
- Chenoderus tricolor

Scientific classification
- Kingdom: Animalia
- Phylum: Arthropoda
- Class: Insecta
- Order: Coleoptera
- Suborder: Polyphaga
- Infraorder: Cucujiformia
- Family: Cerambycidae
- Subfamily: Cerambycinae
- Tribe: Unxiini
- Genus: Chenoderus; Fairmaire & Germain, 1859

= Chenoderus =

Genus of beetles

Chenoderus is a genus of beetles in the family Cerambycidae, containing the following species:

- Chenoderus bicolor Fairmaire & Germain, 1861
- Chenoderus testaceus (Blanchard in Gay, 1851)
- Chenoderus tricolor (Fairmaire & Germain, 1859)
- Chenoderus venustus Fairmaire & Germain, 1861
