= Rierguscha viridipennis =

Scientific classification
- Kingdom: Animalia
- Phylum: Arthropoda
- Class: Insecta
- Order: Coleoptera
- Suborder: Polyphaga
- Infraorder: Cucujiformia
- Family: Cerambycidae
- Genus: Rierguscha
- Species: R. viridipennis

Binomial name
- Rierguscha viridipennis (Bruch, 1925)

Species of beetle

Rierguscha viridipennis is a species of beetle in the family Cerambycidae. It was described by Bruch in 1925.
