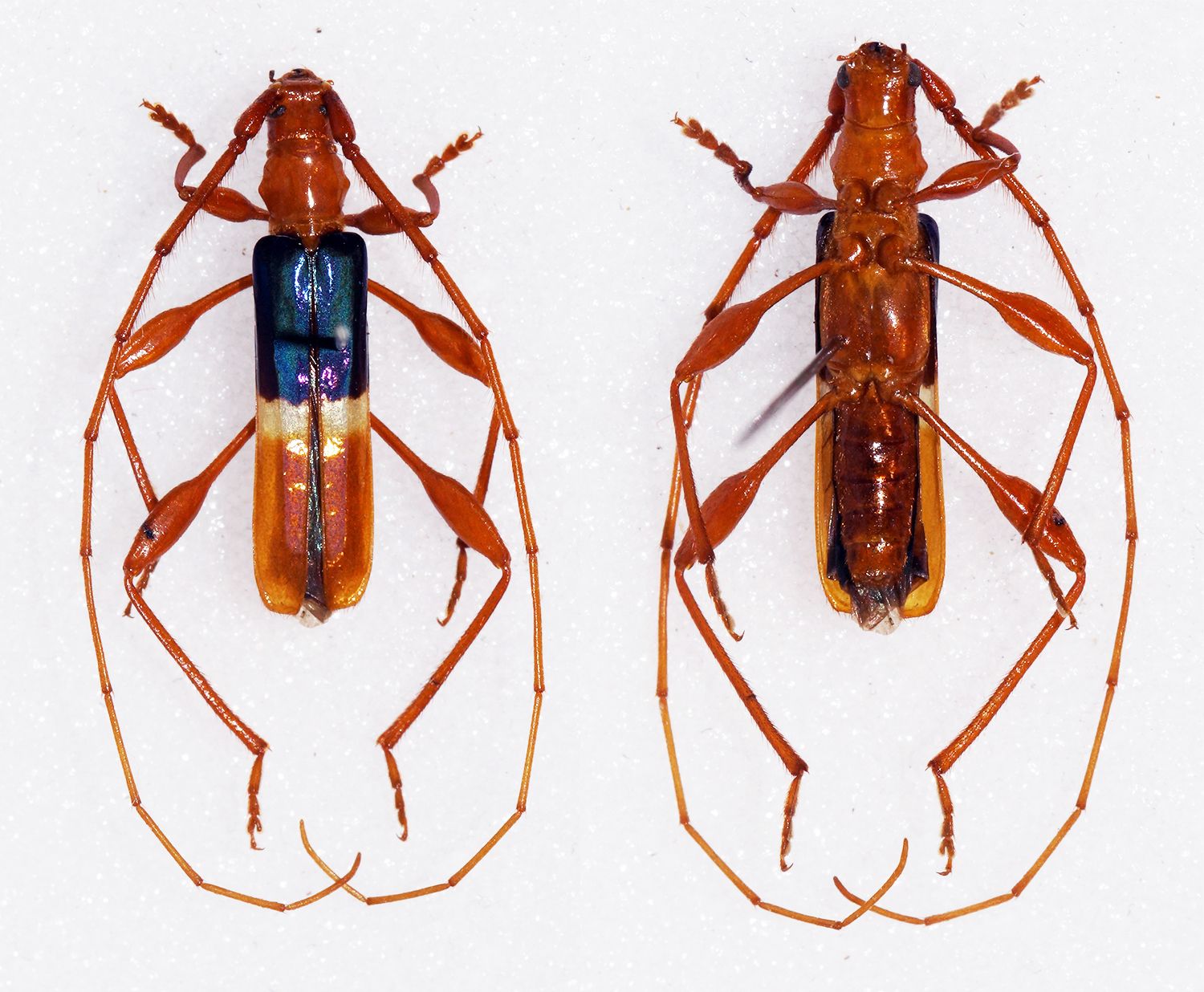

Scientific classification
- Kingdom: Animalia
- Phylum: Arthropoda
- Class: Insecta
- Order: Coleoptera
- Suborder: Polyphaga
- Infraorder: Cucujiformia
- Family: Cerambycidae
- Genus: Chenoderus
- Species: C. bicolor

Binomial name
- Chenoderus bicolor Fairmaire & Germain, 1861

= Chenoderus bicolor =

Species of beetle

Chenoderus bicolor is a species of beetle in the family Cerambycidae. It was described by Fairmaire and Germain in 1861.
