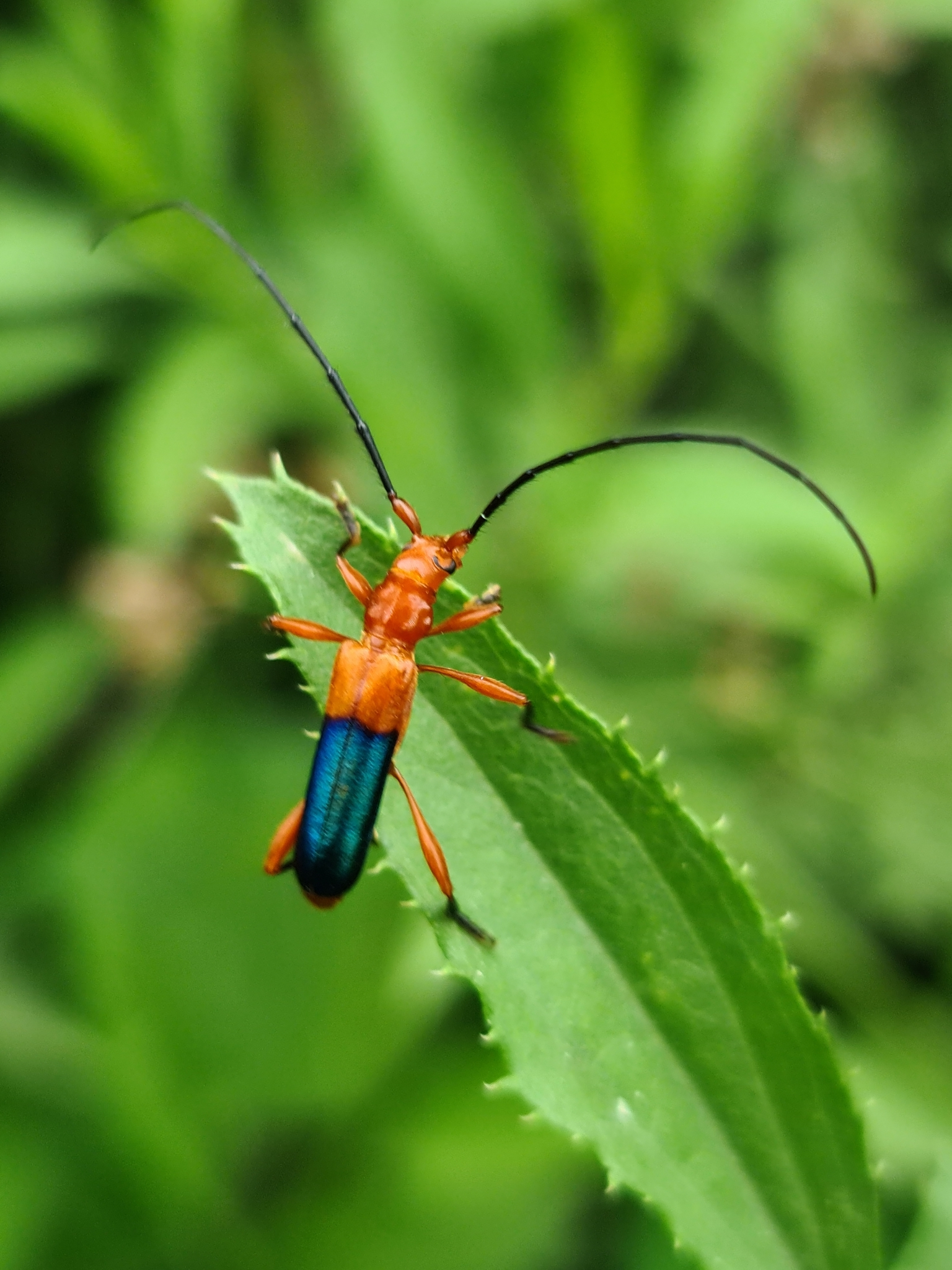
- E. basale from Argentina

Scientific classification
- Kingdom: Animalia
- Phylum: Arthropoda
- Class: Insecta
- Order: Coleoptera
- Suborder: Polyphaga
- Infraorder: Cucujiformia
- Family: Cerambycidae
- Genus: Ethemon
- Species: E. basale

Binomial name
- Ethemon basale (Burmeister, 1865)

= Ethemon basale =

Species of beetle

Ethemon basale is a species of beetle in the family Cerambycidae. It was described by Hermann Burmeister in 1865.
