= Pachodynerus carpenteri =

Scientific classification
- Domain: Eukaryota
- Kingdom: Animalia
- Phylum: Arthropoda
- Class: Insecta
- Order: Hymenoptera
- Family: Vespidae
- Genus: Pachodynerus
- Species: P. carpenteri

Binomial name
- Pachodynerus carpenteri Willink & Roig-Alsina, 1998

Species of wasp

Pachodynerus carpenteri is a potter wasp classified in the family Vespidae, subfamily Eumeninae, native to Mexico, Colombia and Venezuela.
