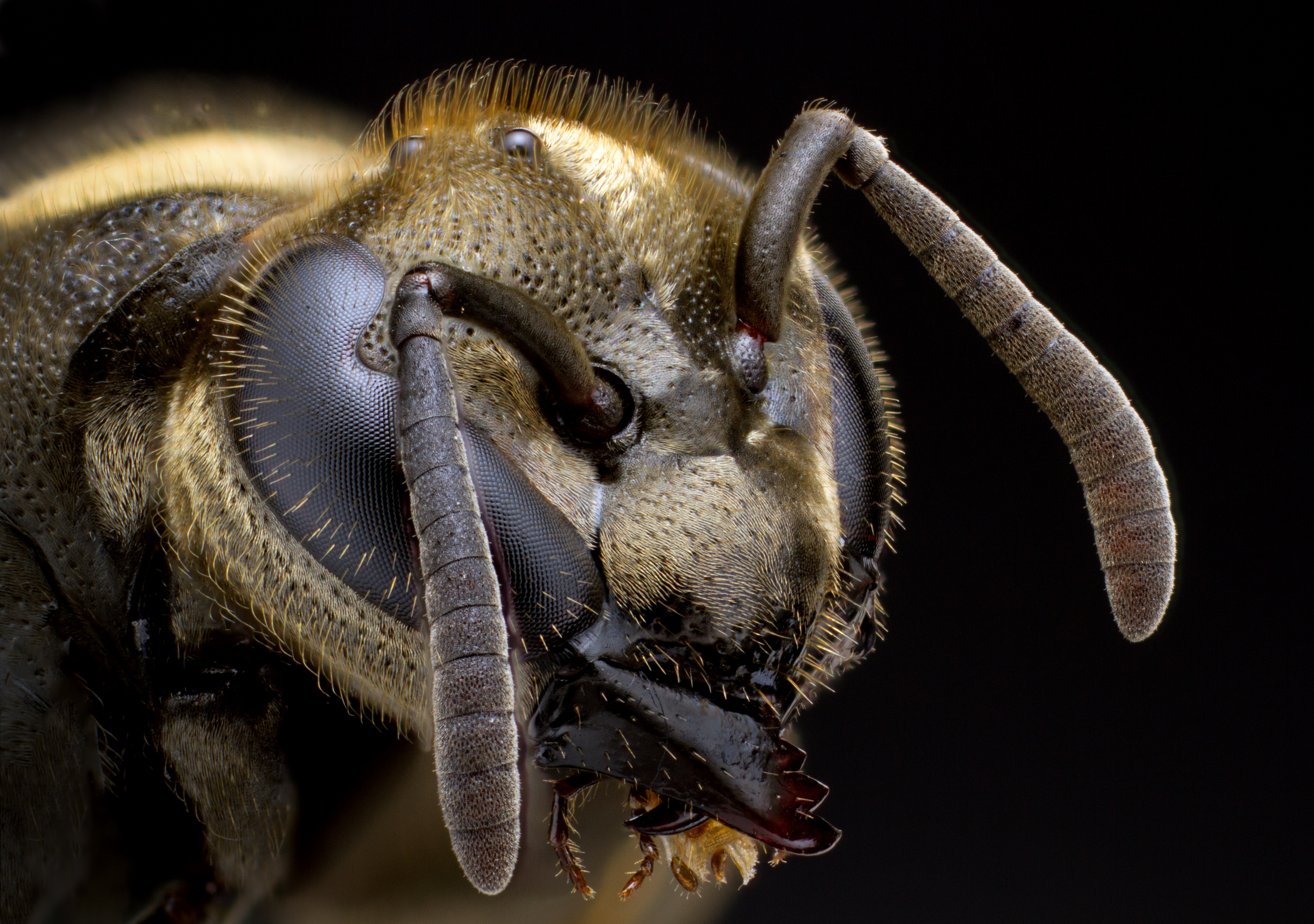
- Close-up

Scientific classification
- Kingdom: Animalia
- Phylum: Arthropoda
- Clade: Pancrustacea
- Class: Insecta
- Order: Hymenoptera
- Family: Vespidae
- Subfamily: Polistinae
- Tribe: Epiponini
- Genus: Brachygastra
- Species: B. mellifica

Binomial name
- Brachygastra mellifica (Say, 1837)

Synonyms
- Polistes mellifica Say, 1837; Nectarinia mellifica (Say, 1837); Caba mellifica (Say, 1837); Chartergus aztecus Cameron, 1906; Chartergus arizonaensis Cameron, 1907; Chartergus centralis Cameron, 1907; Nectarina cameroni Meade-Waldo, 1911

= Brachygastra mellifica =

Species of wasp

Brachygastra mellifica, commonly known as the Mexican honey wasp, is a neotropical social wasp. It can be found in North America. B. mellifica is one of few wasp species that produces honey. It is also considered a delicacy in some cultures in Mexico. This wasp species is of use to humans because it can be used to control pest species and to pollinate avocados.

== Etymology ==
The genus name Brachygastra comes from Ancient Greek βραχύς (brakhús), meaning "short", and γαστήρ (gastḗr), meaning "belly". The specific epithet mellifica means "to make honey" in Latin.

== Taxonomy and phylogeny ==
The species that comprise the genus Brachygastra are neotropical social wasps. They can be found from southern United States to Northern Argentina and include a total of 16 species. B. mellifica is the only species present in the US, found in both Arizona and Texas. B. mellifica ranges from Texas to Panama. This genus is known for its easily recognizable abdomen, which can be almost as wide as it is long, and its very high scutellum that often projects over the metanotum. B. mellifica is very similar in morphology to B. lecheguana but differs in its geographic distribution.

== Description and identification ==
=== Appearance ===
In general, external reproductive organs can distinguish males from females; only females have stingers. Workers and males share the same coloration. They both have alternating abdominal bands of yellow and black. Queens characteristically have a dark reddish-brown abdominal coloration. Queens can also be distinguished from workers due to the occurrence of sperm in the spermathecae of the queens. This species is small with a body length of 7-9 mm.

=== Nests ===
Brachygastra mellifica make paper nests that range in size from 40–50 cm in diameter. These nests are quite full and can house anywhere from 3,500 to 18,700 wasps. The nest begins as a single irregular layer of cells attached to the first layer of carton on a branch. Clumps of cells on the branch are then extended into the first hanging layer. Successive layers are formed independently and extend out and around the bottom of the first layer. This happens multiple times around and over the previous layer, resulting in a growing spiral. The nest goes from a small, flat oval to a sausage- or capsule-like shape over time. The surface of the nest is blotchy, colored brown or grey, varying as a result of the raw materials used for construction. The texture of the surface is that of rough cardboard, and is not glossy.

== Distribution and habitat ==
The Mexican honey wasp is found in a range from northern Panama through most of subtropical Central America and Mexico. They are also found in southeastern Arizona and the most southern counties of Texas. It builds its nest in the canopy of a shrub or a tree, often 1 to 9 m above the ground. Nests are often reported to be located in suburban settings that are close to human habitation. They are well covered in the foliage in which they are built. These nests can be threatened by urban development, such as in Texas.

== Colony cycle ==
Nests of B. mellifica can have anywhere from 3,500 to 18,700 wasps. Populations are abundant during July and September, which are times associated with plentiful citrus groves and thus large populations of the psyllid Diaphorina citri, a common prey of B. mellifica. When the D. citri nymphs are not plentiful, the wasps nearly disappear until D. citri populations return the following spring. Clusters of colonies of B. mellifica are common, which suggests that swarms may only travel several hundred meters to start a new colony. According to some sources, it is not apparent whether queens start new colonies independently or if they intrude on another colony. Queens either mate and reproduce in their original colony, or can split off with a number of workers, in order to found a new colony via swarming.

Males do also remain in their biological colonies and do not travel to other colonies to seek matings. Depending on the ratio of workers to queens in the colony, queens will regulate the number of new queens and workers raised. New queens are not produced unless there is only one queen remaining, following a cyclical monogyny colony cycle. Like most eusocial hymenoptera, communities of B. mellifica consist predominantly of sterile female workers and relatively few male drones and queens. The number of fertilized queens can range into the hundreds in B. mellifica colonies. The high relatedness of a given colony's queens may indicate that such queens are only produced in the colony when there is a single queen. Colonies with a single queen have not been reported, indicating that if such a condition exists that it is a short-lived period in the colony's life cycle.

== Kin selection and genetic relatedness within colonies ==
=== Queen to worker relatedness ===
Queens within a single colony are highly related, which is consistent with the hypothesis that queens are only produced when the colony contains one queen. In a study on kin selection and relatedness the worker wasps were considerably more related to the queens than to other workers. On average, workers have an r=0.37 for relatedness to queens.

=== Worker to worker relatedness ===
B. mellifica genetics show high levels of relatedness among workers despite the large number of queens per colony. R=0.23 for all workers to each other, which is significantly lower than the relatedness of workers to queens. Genetic relatedness was determined in the study using PCR. DNA microsatellites are good genetic markers for studying relatedness due to their Mendelian behavior and high variability. DNA was sampled from the whole wasp, thorax and head, or thorax alone in this study.

=== Worker-queen conflict ===
The split-sex ratio is a result of the asymmetrical relatedness between brothers and sisters, since B. mellifica are haplodiploid. When there are many queens, males are produced. Since workers can share a maximum of 3/4 of their genes with sisters, they favor caring for female siblings over male siblings, who only share a maximum of 1/2 of their genes. Since this wasp follows a cyclical monogynous pattern, there is increased relatedness among all of the progeny. The split-sex ratio is the most distinct in any swarm-founding wasp currently studied. Research done on kin selection and relatedness showed that queens produce the eggs that become males, not workers. Workers 'police' each other to make sure the queens produce most, if not all, of the males.

== Interaction with other species ==
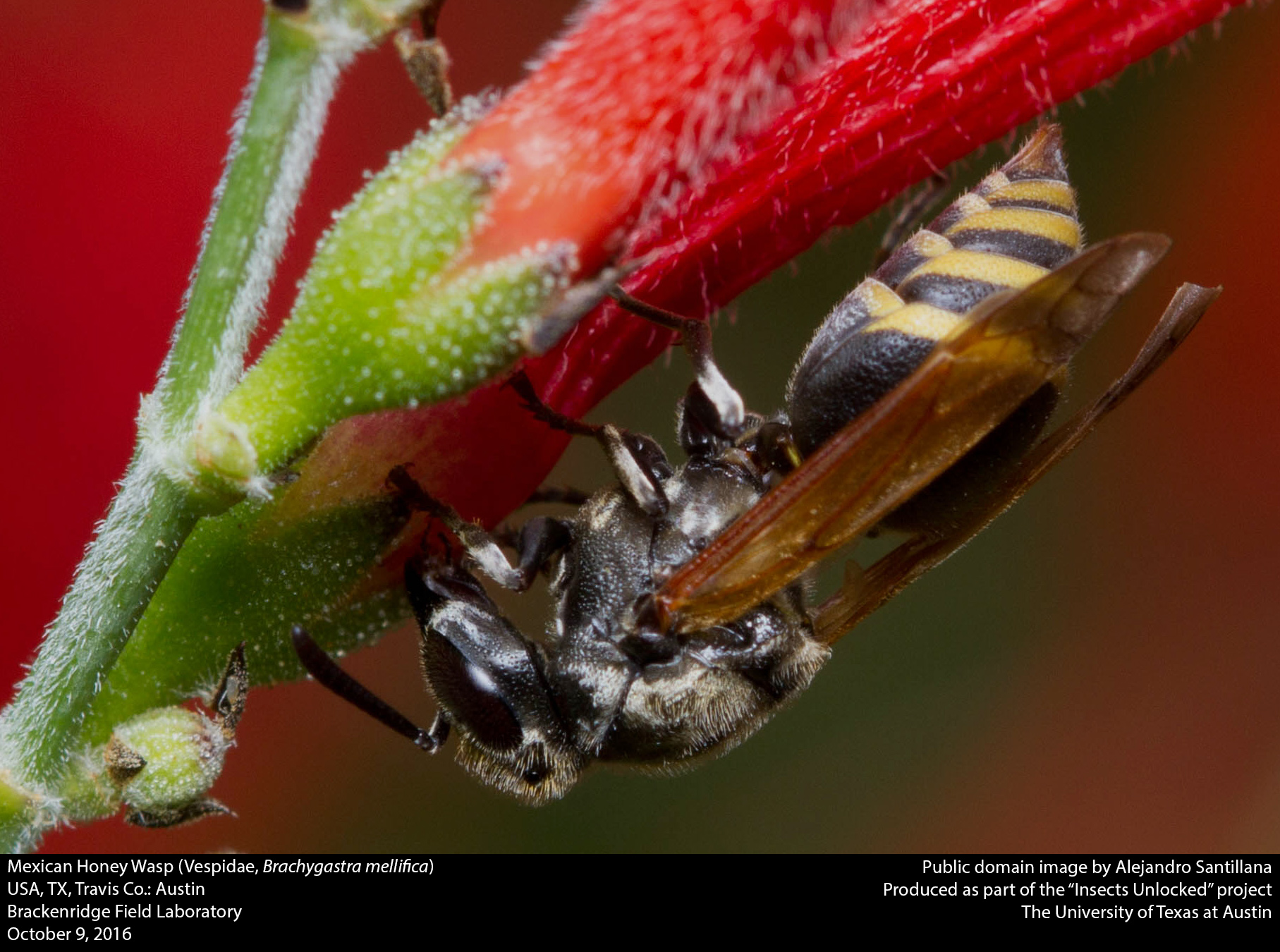
A picture of the Honey Wasp on a red flower.

=== Diet ===
Brachygastra mellifica is very good at searching and feeding on Diaphorina citri in tree flushes, an introduced species that has become one of their major prey items. These wasps feed not only on the fluids from the prey, but may also eat the entire exoskeleton of D. citri. They also may consume larvae of the weevil Anthonomus aeneoulus and a moth from the family Alucitidae. Trophallaxis, or regurgitation, has also been observed on the nest surface of the Mexican honey wasp, in which the forager regurgitates a drop of nectar to a responsive wasp.

=== Predators ===
Diogmites angustipennis is a robber fly known to prey on honeybees that has been observed preying on B. mellifica. Orb-weaving spiders have also been known to take single wasps as prey outside the nest. Attacks on the entire nest are also common. Both opossums and golden-fronted woodpeckers have been seen dissecting a nest. Other dismembered nests have damage that is similar to the damage caused by the woodpeckers to the nests.

== Human importance ==
=== Pollinator ===
It is thought that wasps and stingless bees were the first pollinators of the avocado, before the introduction of the European honeybee to the Americas. Brachygastra mellifica are pollinators because when they collect food for their larvae; they carry an abundance of pollen on their hairy head – including avocado pollen. They also carry pollen on their thorax and legs, and inside their unique thoracic cavities. While many other wasp species visit avocado flowers, they contribute less to pollination due to lower visitation rates and/or carrying less pollen on their bodies.

=== Hunter of pest insects ===
It has been suggested that B. mellifica can be used as a natural biological control agent. They offer many features, such as the ease of which the nests can be moved, the speediness of population growth, and the fact that closed system preservation is possible. One pest species of particular interest to scientists is Diaphorina citri, a very destructive pest of Citrus trees, which carries bacteria that make the fruit inedible and slowly kill the trees (citrus greening disease). Diaphorina citri is a major prey of B. mellifa and it would be beneficial to use these wasps to attack these pests.

=== Honey production ===
B. mellifica is one of few insects besides bees to create and store their own honey. Chromatographic analysis of B. mellifica honey showed 6/7 of the same peaks that appeared in honeybee mesquite honey. Melibiose is the only peak that did not occur in both honeys. Both the glucose and fructose content in B. mellifica honey are comparable to that of honeybee mesquite honey. The similarities in the two honeys substantiate the idea that these are foraging wasps, because honey stores come from multiple common floral sources, such as mesquite and sunflower.

=== Source of food ===
Brachygastra mellifica serve as a food source for the Popoloca Town of Los Reyes Metzontla, Mexico. The Popolucas have at least 17 species of insects in their diet, including B. mellifica and other wasps. The Spanish local name for this delicacy is "Panal Miniagua", and the Popoluca name is "Cuchii". They eat the honey and larvae of these wasps year round, but only harvest when the moon is between its last quarter and waning gibbous. According to traditional knowledge and experience, the nests are full of honey and larvae at this time. These insects can be cooked and eaten with salsa and tortillas.
