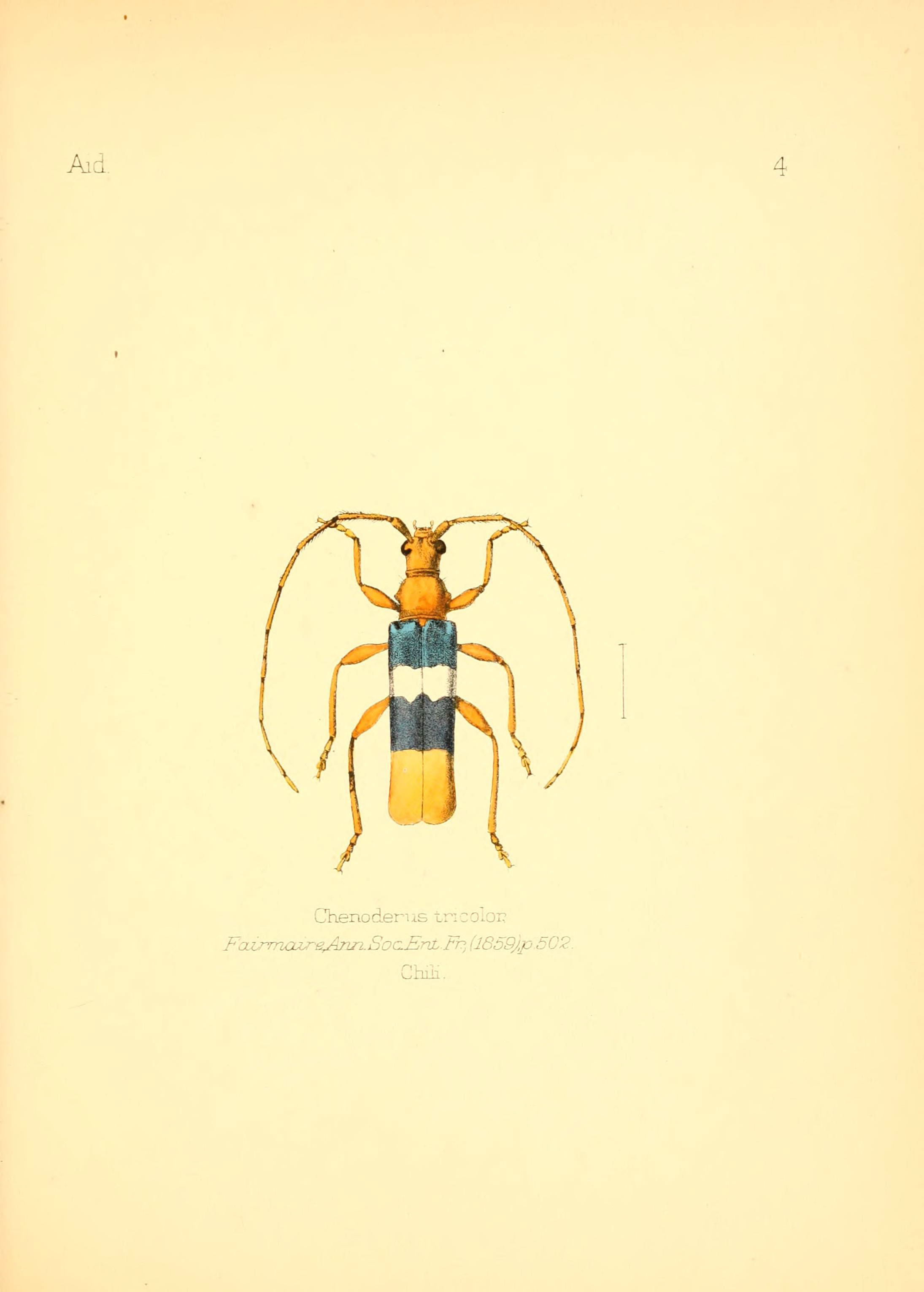

Scientific classification
- Kingdom: Animalia
- Phylum: Arthropoda
- Class: Insecta
- Order: Coleoptera
- Suborder: Polyphaga
- Infraorder: Cucujiformia
- Family: Cerambycidae
- Genus: Chenoderus
- Species: C. tricolor

Binomial name
- Chenoderus tricolor (Fairmaire & Germain, 1859)

= Chenoderus tricolor =

Species of beetle

Chenoderus tricolor is a species of beetle in the family Cerambycidae. It was described by Fairmaire and Germain in 1859.
