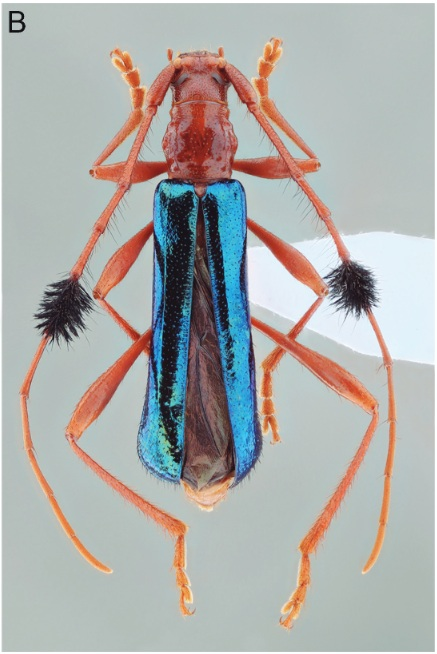

Scientific classification
- Kingdom: Animalia
- Phylum: Arthropoda
- Clade: Pancrustacea
- Class: Insecta
- Order: Coleoptera
- Suborder: Polyphaga
- Infraorder: Cucujiformia
- Family: Cerambycidae
- Genus: Paromoeocerus
- Species: P. barbicornis

Binomial name
- Paromoeocerus barbicornis (Fabricius, 1792)

Synonyms
- Saperda barbicornis Fabricius, 1792; Saperda plumigera Olivier, 1800; Cosmisoma equestre Guérin-Méneville, 1844

= Paromoeocerus barbicornis =

Species of beetle

Paromoeocerus barbicornis is a species of beetle in the family Cerambycidae. It was described by Johan Christian Fabricius in 1792. It is found in Brazil (Bahia, Minas Gerais, Espirito Santo, Rio de Janeiro, São Paulo, Paraná, Santa Catarina, Rio Grande do Sul), Paraguay, Argentina and Uruguay.
