= Unxia gracilior =

Scientific classification
- Kingdom: Animalia
- Phylum: Arthropoda
- Class: Insecta
- Order: Coleoptera
- Suborder: Polyphaga
- Infraorder: Cucujiformia
- Family: Cerambycidae
- Genus: Unxia
- Species: U. gracilior

Binomial name
- Unxia gracilior (Burmeister, 1865)

Species of beetle

Unxia gracilior is a species of beetle in the family Cerambycidae. It was described by Hermann Burmeister in 1865.
