= Chenoderus venustus =

Scientific classification
- Kingdom: Animalia
- Phylum: Arthropoda
- Class: Insecta
- Order: Coleoptera
- Suborder: Polyphaga
- Infraorder: Cucujiformia
- Family: Cerambycidae
- Genus: Chenoderus
- Species: C. venustus

Binomial name
- Chenoderus venustus Fairmaire & Germain, 1861

Species of beetle

Chenoderus venustus is a species of beetle in the family Cerambycidae. It was described by Fairmaire and Germain in 1861.
