= Ethemon weiseri =

Scientific classification
- Kingdom: Animalia
- Phylum: Arthropoda
- Class: Insecta
- Order: Coleoptera
- Suborder: Polyphaga
- Infraorder: Cucujiformia
- Family: Cerambycidae
- Genus: Ethemon
- Species: E. weiseri

Binomial name
- Ethemon weiseri Bruch, 1926

Species of beetle

Ethemon weiseri is a species of beetle in the family Cerambycidae. It was described by Bruch in 1926.
