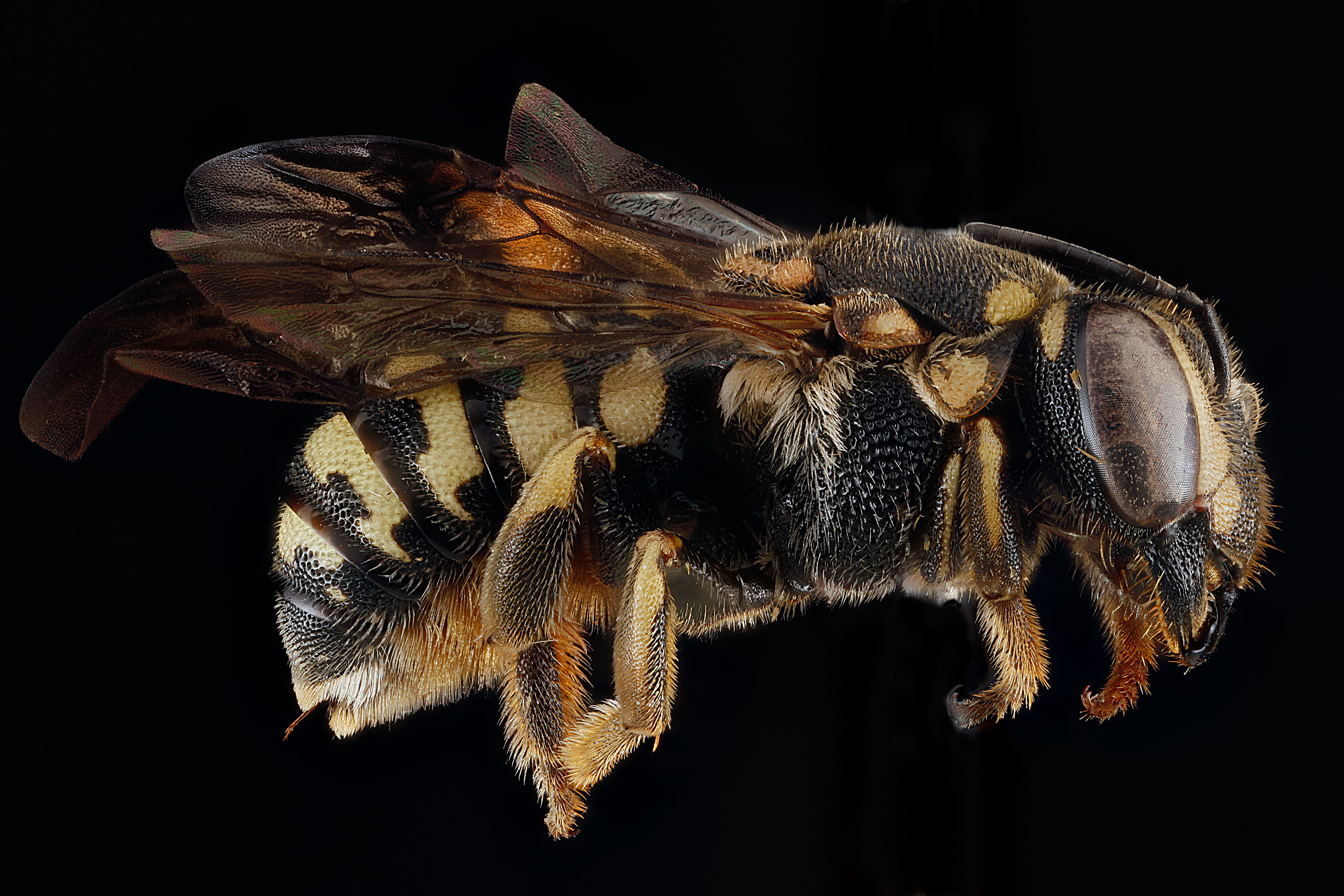

Scientific classification
- Domain: Eukaryota
- Kingdom: Animalia
- Phylum: Arthropoda
- Class: Insecta
- Order: Hymenoptera
- Family: Megachilidae
- Genus: Dianthidium
- Species: D. simile

Binomial name
- Dianthidium simile (Cresson, 1864)

= Dianthidium simile =

Species of bee

Dianthidium simile is a species of leafcutter, mason, and resin bees in the family Megachilidae. It is found in North America.
