= Ethemon =

Scientific classification
- Kingdom: Animalia
- Phylum: Arthropoda
- Class: Insecta
- Order: Coleoptera
- Suborder: Polyphaga
- Infraorder: Cucujiformia
- Family: Cerambycidae
- Subfamily: Cerambycinae
- Tribe: Unxiini
- Genus: Ethemon; Thomson, 1864

Genus of beetles

Ethemon is a genus of beetles in the family Cerambycidae, containing the following species:

- Ethemon basale (Burmeister, 1865)
- Ethemon basirufum Napp, 1979
- Ethemon brevicorne Napp & Reynaud, 1998
- Ethemon imbasale Tippmann, 1960
- Ethemon iuba Napp & Martins, 2006
- Ethemon lepidum Thomson, 1864
- Ethemon weiseri Bruch, 1926
