= Allopeba paranaensis =

Scientific classification
- Kingdom: Animalia
- Phylum: Arthropoda
- Class: Insecta
- Order: Coleoptera
- Suborder: Polyphaga
- Infraorder: Cucujiformia
- Family: Cerambycidae
- Genus: Allopeba
- Species: A. paranaensis

Binomial name
- Allopeba paranaensis (Napp & Reynaud, 1998)

Species of beetle

Allopeba paranaensis is a species of beetle in the family Cerambycidae. It was described by Napp and Reynaud in 1998.
