= Rierguscha =

Scientific classification
- Kingdom: Animalia
- Phylum: Arthropoda
- Class: Insecta
- Order: Coleoptera
- Suborder: Polyphaga
- Infraorder: Cucujiformia
- Family: Cerambycidae
- Tribe: Unxiini
- Genus: Rierguscha

Genus of beetles

Rierguscha is a genus of beetles in the family Cerambycidae, containing the following species:

- Rierguscha bicolor Viana, 1970
- Rierguscha florida Napp & Martins, 2006
- Rierguscha viridipennis (Bruch, 1925)
