= Unxia insignis =

Scientific classification
- Kingdom: Animalia
- Phylum: Arthropoda
- Clade: Pancrustacea
- Class: Insecta
- Order: Coleoptera
- Suborder: Polyphaga
- Infraorder: Cucujiformia
- Family: Cerambycidae
- Genus: Unxia
- Species: U. insignis

Binomial name
- Unxia insignis (Guérin-Méneville, 1844)

Species of beetle

Unxia insignis is a species of beetle in the family Cerambycidae. It was described by Félix Édouard Guérin-Méneville in 1844.
