= Pachodynerus nasidens =

Scientific classification
- Kingdom: Animalia
- Phylum: Arthropoda
- Clade: Pancrustacea
- Class: Insecta
- Order: Hymenoptera
- Family: Vespidae
- Genus: Pachodynerus
- Species: P. nasidens

Binomial name
- Pachodynerus nasidens (Latreille)

Species of wasp

Pachodynerus nasidens, the keyhole wasp, is a species of stinging wasp in the family Vespidae. It is native to the Neotropics and has been introduced to the northern United States and in some Pacific Ocean areas. In Brisbane, Australia, it was recently introduced and reported as a risk factor to air safety, because aircraft Pitot Tubes present an attractive nesting venue for these wasps.

Keyhole wasp, Pachodynerus nasidens
