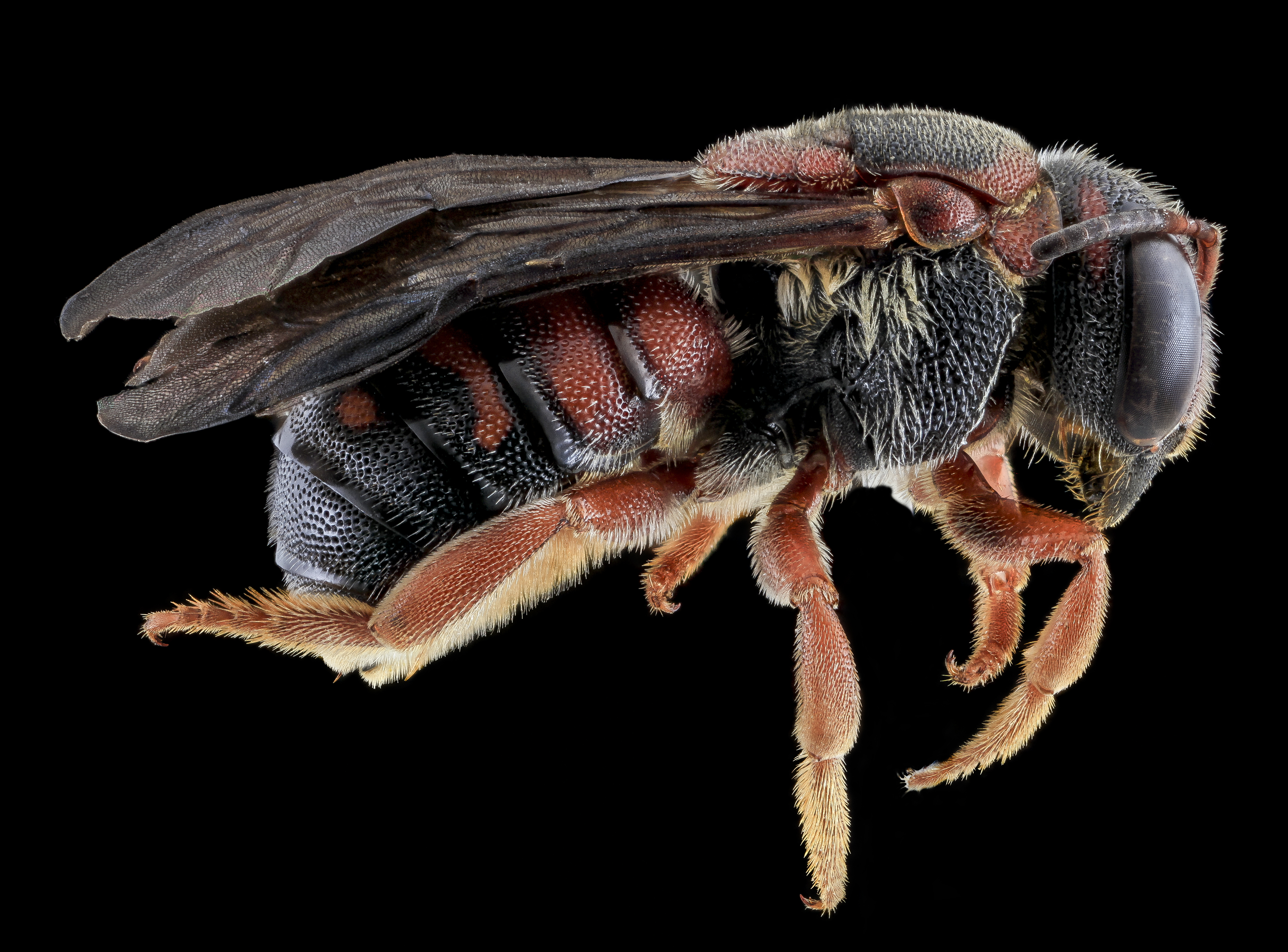

Scientific classification
- Kingdom: Animalia
- Phylum: Arthropoda
- Class: Insecta
- Order: Hymenoptera
- Family: Megachilidae
- Tribe: Anthidiini
- Genus: Dianthidium
- Species: D. floridiense

Binomial name
- Dianthidium floridiense Schwarz, 1926

= Dianthidium floridiense =

Species of bee

Dianthidium floridiense is a species of bee in the family of Megachilidae. It is found in North America.
