= Rierguscha bicolor =

Scientific classification
- Kingdom: Animalia
- Phylum: Arthropoda
- Class: Insecta
- Order: Coleoptera
- Suborder: Polyphaga
- Infraorder: Cucujiformia
- Family: Cerambycidae
- Genus: Rierguscha
- Species: R. bicolor

Binomial name
- Rierguscha bicolor Viana, 1970

Species of beetle

Rierguscha bicolor is a species of beetle in the family Cerambycidae. It was described by Viana in 1970.
