= Chariergus =

Scientific classification
- Kingdom: Animalia
- Phylum: Arthropoda
- Class: Insecta
- Order: Coleoptera
- Suborder: Polyphaga
- Infraorder: Cucujiformia
- Family: Cerambycidae
- Tribe: Unxiini
- Genus: Chariergus

Genus of beetles

Chariergus is a genus of beetles in the family Cerambycidae, containing the following species:

- Chariergus caeruleus Napp & Reynaud, 1998
- Chariergus tabidus (Klug, 1825)
