= Ethemon lepidum =

Scientific classification
- Kingdom: Animalia
- Phylum: Arthropoda
- Class: Insecta
- Order: Coleoptera
- Suborder: Polyphaga
- Infraorder: Cucujiformia
- Family: Cerambycidae
- Genus: Ethemon
- Species: E. lepidum

Binomial name
- Ethemon lepidum Thomson, 1864

Species of beetle

Ethemon lepidum is a species of beetle in the family Cerambycidae. It was described by Thomson in 1864.
