= Paromoeocerus =

Scientific classification
- Kingdom: Animalia
- Phylum: Arthropoda
- Class: Insecta
- Order: Coleoptera
- Suborder: Polyphaga
- Infraorder: Cucujiformia
- Family: Cerambycidae
- Subfamily: Cerambycinae
- Tribe: Unxiini
- Genus: Paromoeocerus; Gounelle, 1910

Genus of beetles

Paromoeocerus is a genus of beetles in the family Cerambycidae, containing the following species:

- Paromoeocerus barbicornis (Fabricius, 1792)
- Paromoeocerus notabilis Melzer, 1918
- Paromoeocerus scabricollis Melzer, 1927
- Paromoeocerus stictonotus Napp, 1976
- Paromoeocerus vestitus Gounelle, 1910
