= Chariergus caeruleus =

Scientific classification
- Kingdom: Animalia
- Phylum: Arthropoda
- Class: Insecta
- Order: Coleoptera
- Suborder: Polyphaga
- Infraorder: Cucujiformia
- Family: Cerambycidae
- Genus: Chariergus
- Species: C. caeruleus

Binomial name
- Chariergus caeruleus Napp & Reynaud, 1998

Species of beetle

Chariergus caeruleus is a species of beetle in the family Cerambycidae. It was described by Napp and Reynaud in 1998.
