= Chariergus tabidus =

Scientific classification
- Kingdom: Animalia
- Phylum: Arthropoda
- Clade: Pancrustacea
- Class: Insecta
- Order: Coleoptera
- Suborder: Polyphaga
- Infraorder: Cucujiformia
- Family: Cerambycidae
- Genus: Chariergus
- Species: C. tabidus

Binomial name
- Chariergus tabidus (Klug, 1825)

Species of beetle

Chariergus tabidus is a species of beetle in the family Cerambycidae. It was described by Johann Christoph Friedrich Klug in 1825. It is found in Brazil (Goiás, Bahia, Minas Gerais, Espírito Santo, Rio de Janeiro, São Paulo, Paraná, Santa Catarina, Rio Grande do Sul), Argentina (Corrientes, Entre Ríos) and Uruguay.
