= Parunxia =

Parunxia scopifera

Scientific classification
- Kingdom: Animalia
- Phylum: Arthropoda
- Class: Insecta
- Order: Coleoptera
- Suborder: Polyphaga
- Infraorder: Cucujiformia
- Family: Cerambycidae
- Genus: Parunxia
- Species: P. scopifera

Binomial name
- Parunxia scopifera (Klug, 1825)

Genus of beetles

Parunxia scopifera is a species of beetle in the family Cerambycidae, the only species in the genus Parunxia.
