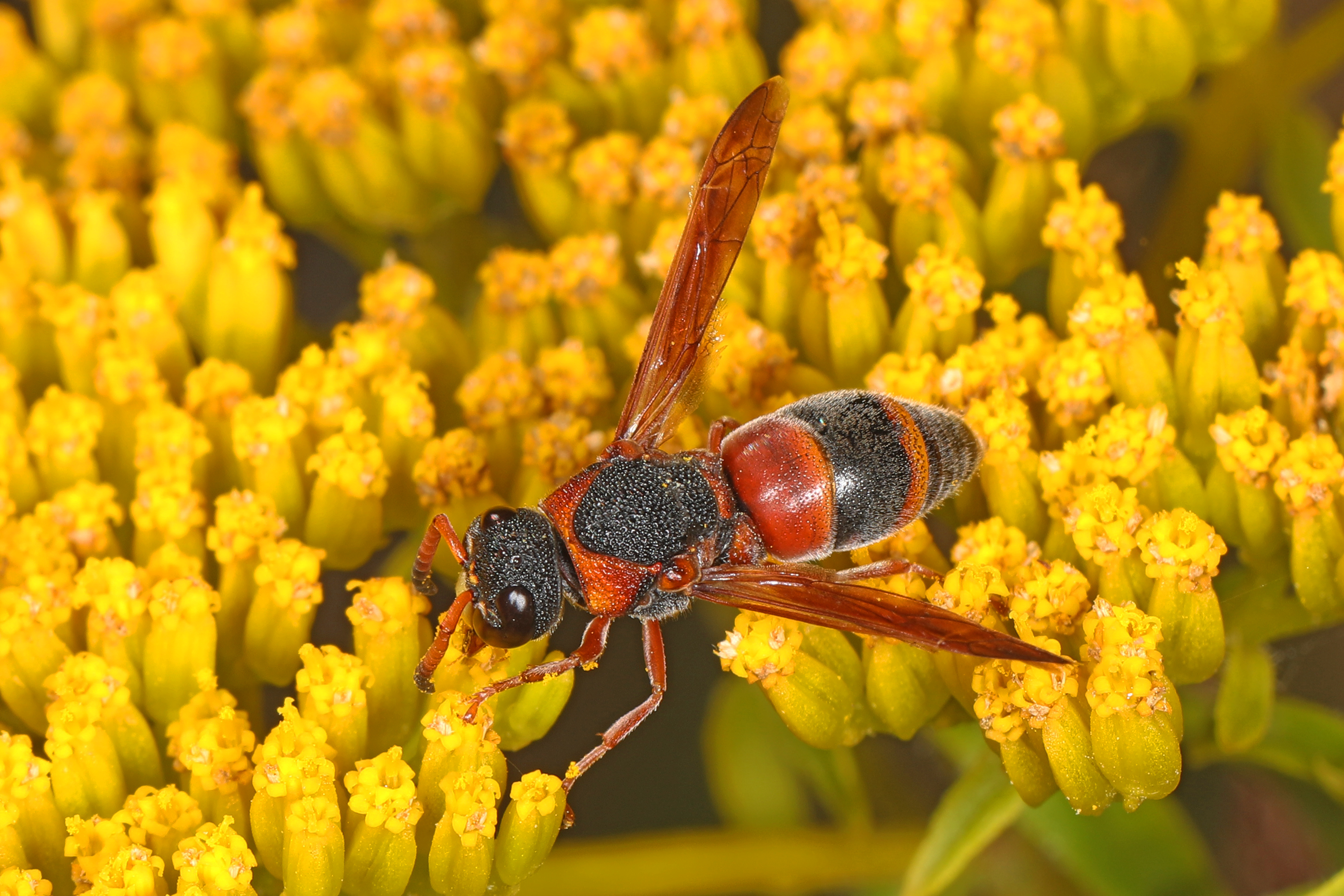
- Red-marked pachodynerus

Scientific classification
- Kingdom: Animalia
- Phylum: Arthropoda
- Clade: Pancrustacea
- Class: Insecta
- Order: Hymenoptera
- Family: Vespidae
- Subfamily: Eumeninae
- Genus: Pachodynerus; Saussure, 1870

Type species
- Odynerus californicus Saussure, 1870

Species
- Pachodynerus alayoi; Pachodynerus anodontus; Pachodynerus argentinus; Pachodynerus argentipilis; Pachodynerus argyrotrichus; Pachodynerus atratus; Pachodynerus bicuspidatus; Pachodynerus brachygaster; Pachodynerus brevifasciatus; Pachodynerus brevithorax; Pachodynerus californicus; Pachodynerus carpenteri; Pachodynerus cinerascens; Pachodynerus corumbae; Pachodynerus creber; Pachodynerus cubensis; Pachodynerus diabolicus; Pachodynerus erynnis; Pachodynerus gaullei; Pachodynerus gayi; Pachodynerus gianellii; Pachodynerus grandis; Pachodynerus guadulpensis; Pachodynerus jamaicensis; Pachodynerus jujuyensis; Pachodynerus laplatae; Pachodynerus lima; Pachodynerus linda; Pachodynerus menkei; Pachodynerus mimicus; Pachodynerus nasidens; Pachodynerus nigriculus; Pachodynerus orinoco; Pachodynerus pannus; Pachodynerus parachartergoides; Pachodynerus peruensis; Pachodynerus pulverulentus; Pachodynerus reticulatus; Pachodynerus ruficeps; Pachodynerus scrupeus; Pachodynerus sericeus; Pachodynerus serrulatus; Pachodynerus tibialis; Pachodynerus truncatus; Pachodynerus ucayali

= Pachodynerus =

Genus of wasps

Pachodynerus is a fairly large (about 50 species) neotropical and nearctic genus of potter wasps with higher diversity in central South America. At least one species (Pachodynerus nasidens) has been introduced in other biogeographical regions, including several oceanic islands, while Pachodynerus erynnis occurs on Ascension Island as well as in North America. This genus is most closely related to the genus Euodynerus.
