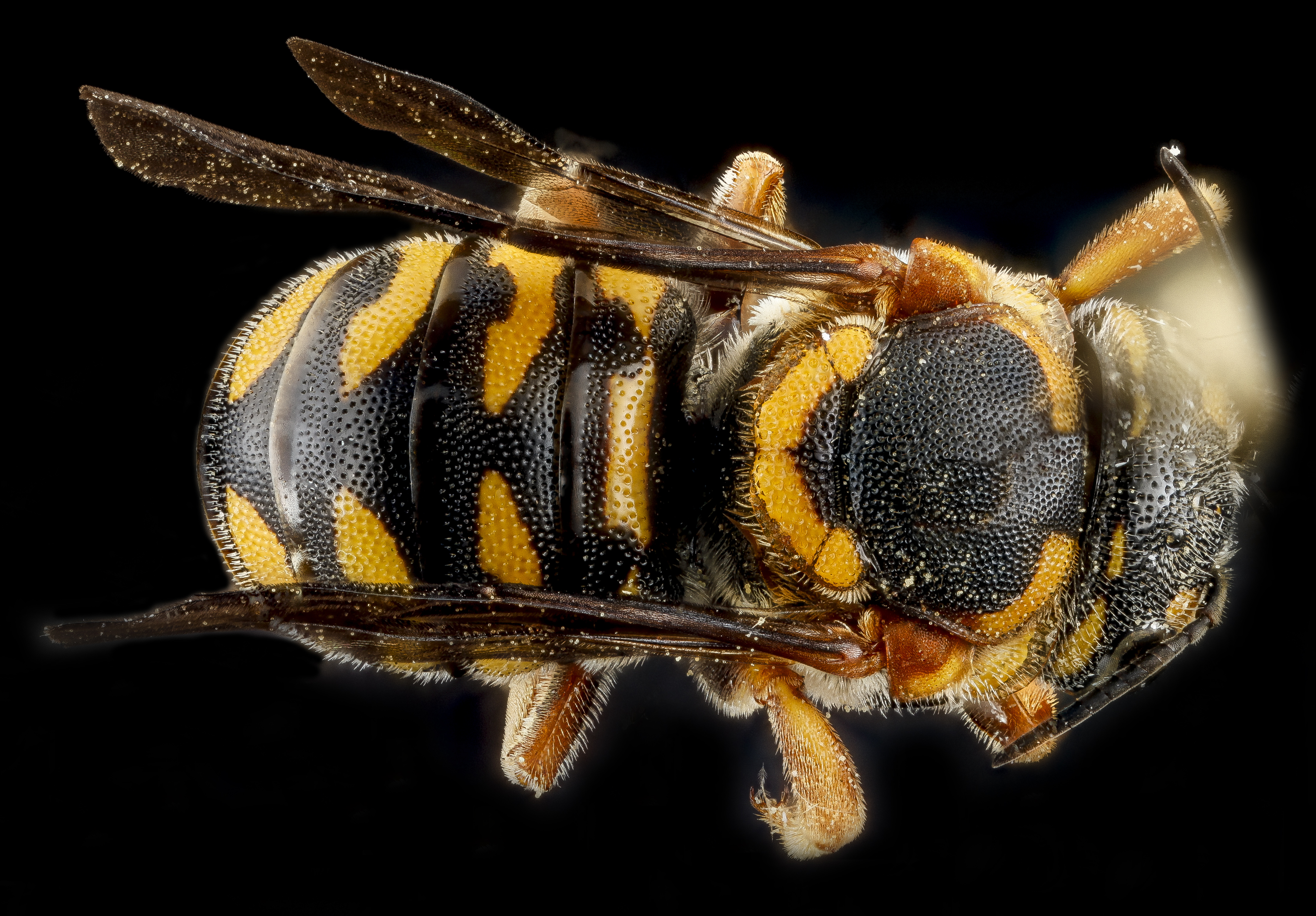
- Dianthidium curvatum

Scientific classification
- Kingdom: Animalia
- Phylum: Arthropoda
- Class: Insecta
- Order: Hymenoptera
- Family: Megachilidae
- Tribe: Anthidiini
- Genus: Dianthidium; Cockerell, 1900

= Dianthidium =

Genus of bees

Dianthidium is a genus of leafcutter, mason, and resin bees in the family Megachilidae. There are at least 20 described species in Dianthidium.

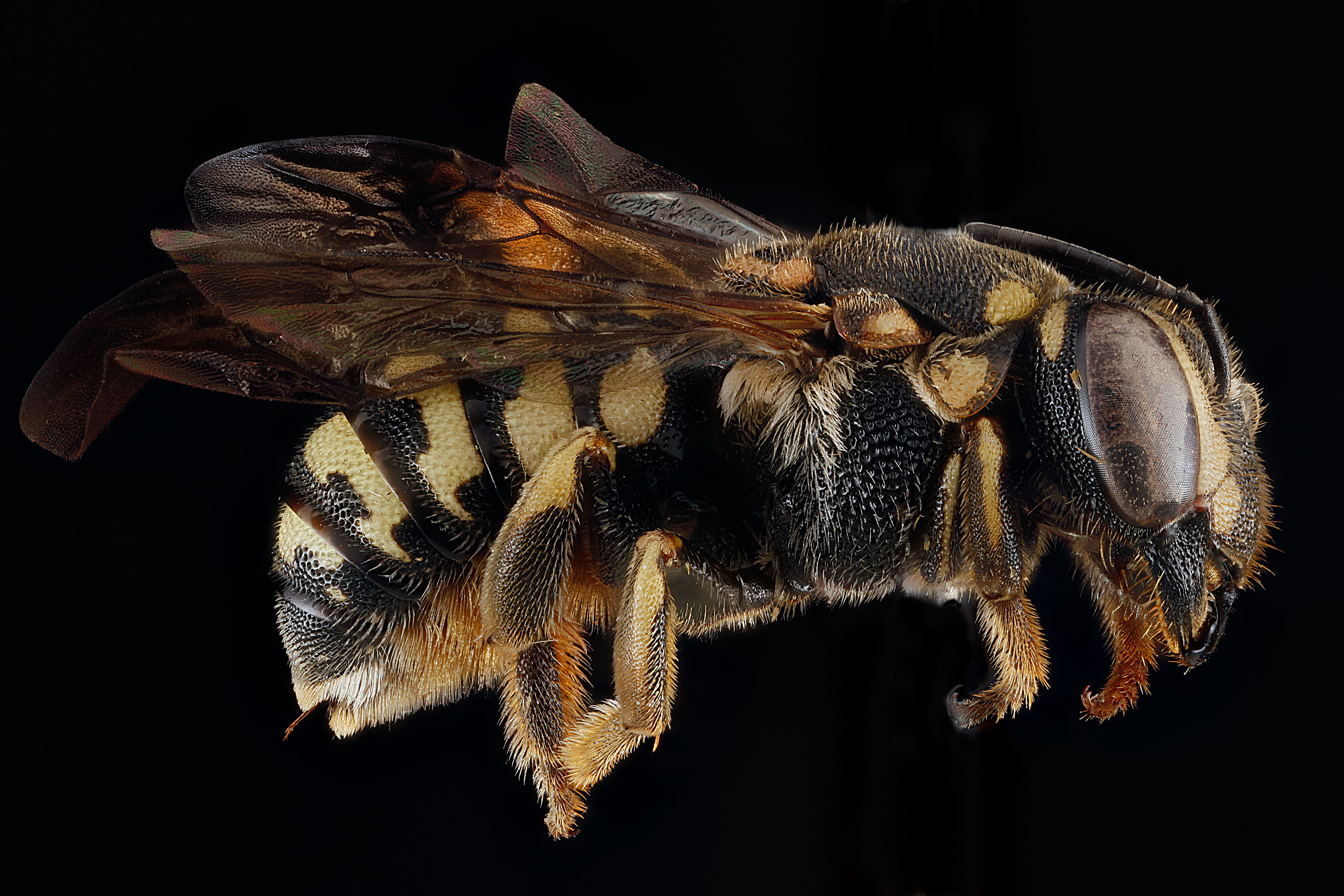
Dianthidium simile

== Species ==
- Dianthidium anophrys Griswold & Michener, 1988
- Dianthidium arizonicum Rohwer, 1916
- Dianthidium bohartorum Griswold & Michener, 1988
- Dianthidium chamela Griswold & Michener, 1988
- Dianthidium concinnum (Cresson, 1872)
- Dianthidium cressonii (Dalla Torre, 1896)
- Dianthidium curvatum (Smith, 1854)
- Dianthidium desertorum Timberlake, 1943
- Dianthidium discophorum Griswold & Michener, 1988
- Dianthidium discors Timberlake, 1948
- Dianthidium dubium Schwarz, 1928
- Dianthidium floridiense Schwarz, 1926
- Dianthidium heterulkei Schwarz, 1940
- Dianthidium implicatum Timberlake, 1948
- Dianthidium macrurum Cockerell, 1913
- Dianthidium marshi Grigarick & Stange, 1964
- Dianthidium parkeri Grigarick & Stange, 1964
- Dianthidium parvum (Cresson, 1878)
- Dianthidium platyurum Cockerell, 1923
- Dianthidium plenum Timberlake, 1943
- Dianthidium pudicum (Cresson, 1879)
- Dianthidium rossi Timberlake, 1949
- Dianthidium simile (Cresson, 1864)
- Dianthidium singulare (Cresson, 1879)
- Dianthidium sonorum (Michener, 1942)
- Dianthidium subparvum Swenk, 1914
- Dianthidium subrufulum Timberlake, 1943
- Dianthidium texanum (Cresson, 1878)
- Dianthidium ulkei (Cresson, 1878)
