= Caste (disambiguation) =

Caste is a system of social stratification and hierarchy in human societies. It may also refer to:

== Basic meanings ==
- Caste systems in Africa
- Caste system in India
  - Balinese caste system
  - Caste system in Goa
  - Caste system in Kerala
- Caste system in the Maldives
- Caste system in Nepal
  - Caste system in Newar
- Caste system among South Asian Muslims
- Caste system in Sri Lanka
- Caste (biology), a group in eusocial animals
- Casta, system of classificaion of mixed-raced individuals in colonial Spanish America

== Titles ==
- Caste: The Origins of Our Discontents, a 2020 book by Isabel Wilkerson
- Caste, working title of Origin (film), a 2023 film adaptation by Ava DuVernay
- Caste (play), a play by Thomas William Robertson
- Caste (1930 film), a British film

== See also ==
- Half-caste
