= Unxia (beetle) =

Scientific classification
- Kingdom: Animalia
- Phylum: Arthropoda
- Class: Insecta
- Order: Coleoptera
- Suborder: Polyphaga
- Infraorder: Cucujiformia
- Family: Cerambycidae
- Tribe: Unxiini
- Genus: Unxia; Thomson, 1860

Genus of beetles

Unxia is a genus of beetles in the family Cerambycidae, containing the following species:

- Unxia gracilior (Burmeister, 1865)
- Unxia insignis (Guérin-Méneville, 1844)
- Unxia laeta (Guérin-Méneville, 1844)
