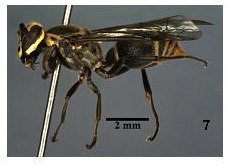

Scientific classification
- Kingdom: Animalia
- Phylum: Arthropoda
- Class: Insecta
- Order: Hymenoptera
- Family: Vespidae
- Subfamily: Polistinae
- Tribe: Epiponini
- Genus: Protonectarina; Ducke, 1910
- Species: P. sylveirae

Binomial name
- Protonectarina sylveirae (Saussure, 1854)

Synonyms
- Polybia enxuy (Smith, 1863)

= Protonectarina =

Genus of wasps

Protonectarina sylveirae is a neotropical swarm-founding wasp species that ranges widely across South America. This species relies heavily on the consumption of animal protein rather than nectar. P. sylveirae preys heavily on agricultural pests to coffee crops, keeping pest populations low.

== Taxonomy and phylogeny ==
P. sylveirae belongs to the order Hymenoptera, which contains roughly 100,000 species of bees, ants, and wasps. The species belongs to the eusocial tribe Epiponini, which is characterized by complex nests, morphological differences between castes, and the occurrence of reproductive polygyny. P. sylveirae is the only species within its genus, and is most closely related to genera Polybia and Protopolybia.

== Description ==
Protonectarina is characterized by its relatively hairy eyes, and can be diagnosed by the width of the clypeus, or the front of the head. Queens have a lighter-colored body and a wider, brown spotted clypeus region compared to that of workers. The clypeus in workers features a black, horseshoe-shaped marking that varies widely among individuals. Queens are typically larger than workers, but this varies from colony to colony: a queen may even be identical in size to the workers in its colony. Age of an P. sylveirae individual can be determined from the pigmentation of the transverse apodeme across the hidden base of the fifth sternum. As a wasp ages, pigment gradually accumulates, and this region darkens.

== Distribution and habitat ==
The distribution of P. sylveirae is wide and stretches from Brazil to Argentina. The species builds nests in trees, typically suspended from twigs. Nests are built from foraged cellulose mashed with water, which forms a papery substance used to construct walls. Cylindrical nests are constructed as a series of enclosing envelopes. When building a nest, the first envelope is built from the substrate, and each subsequent envelope is added to that base. The seams between cells are characteristically irregular, and a simple entrance is built on the ventral surface of the structure. An average nest may have around 50 combs, but nests can be quite large, sometimes 30–40 centimeters long.

This swarm-founding species sends several individuals to forage for pulp, and constructs the nest using the material that the pulp-foragers return with.

== Colony cycle ==
Protonectarina sylveirae colonies are typically large, which produces the need for behavioral specialization. They are swarm-founding wasps, meaning that new colonies are founded by a swarm of individuals, including multiple queens. It is common for a colony of 15,000 workers to have 250 or more queens.

== Behavior ==
=== Dominance hierarchy ===
Queens of a colony are often tested by the workers, and their reactions to the worker's behavior can determine whether they are allowed to remain queen. Workers evaluate the number and quality of the offspring produced by the queen, and monitor the frequency of her aggressive behavior, as that suggests the capability of physical dominance. Clear morphological differences in the larger size of a potential queen compared to workers could suggest her capacity for physical dominance and reproduction, thereby suggesting her quality as a queen.

=== Division of labor ===
Protonectarina sylveirae colonies are broken into two clear castes: queens and workers. These castes are morphologically different, but intermediate morphologies occur in some individuals, providing some social flexibility. The species shows diphasic allometry, which means that two castes and roles within the colony are differentiated by size and shape. This suggests that caste is determined very early in development. Additional resources may be allocated to future queens so that they grow to larger size as adults.

=== Communication ===
Secretions and pheromones are crucial for wasp-to-wasp communication regarding all aspects of colony life. Dominance interactions, search for food and nest sites, reproductive behavior and defense are all mediated by these sensory compounds. Richardson's gland, a secretory gland found in the majority of wasps in the Epinonini tribe, produces organic signal molecules that travel from secretory cells to duct cells before being released into the air. P. sylveirae uses this gland to leave scent trails when traveling from the nest.

=== Foraging behavior ===
Most social wasps act as generalists in the food webs of their ecosystem. They collect and consume nectar and exudates, but also prey upon other arthropods. P. sylveirae is also known to scavenge for animal protein, going as far as to feed on animal carcasses. They are generalist foragers, but can learn and specialize to specific hunting and foraging locations.

== Ovarian development ==
Three categories of ovarian development are determined in this species. Ovaries may vary from small or non-existent to mature and functional. An intermediate phase exists in which oocytes are only developed in the upper portion of the ovary. This last type is associated with young queens, whose size is also smaller on average, making the queen closer in morphology to the working caste.

== Interaction with other species ==
P. sylveirae preys heavily on the coffee-eating moth, Leucoptera coffeella. P. sylveirae attacks and consumes the moth larvae, which do a great deal of damage to coffee crops in South America. By keeping L. coffeella populations in check, the wasp can be very beneficial to both coffee plants and humans.

== Human interaction ==
=== Stings ===
Stings of wasps, including that of Protonectarina sylveirae, typically result in painful inflammation at the site of the wound. This response is due to melittin peptidesPolybia-MP-I, N-2-Polybia-MP-I, Protonectarina-MP-NH2, and Protonectarina-MP-OH. These are specific to P. sylveirae and closely related wasps. 0.8-5% of humans will exhibit a generalized systemic reaction upon being stung by a wasp, including anaphylaxis, which is life-threatening.

=== Effects of pesticides ===
Wasps like Protonectarina often prey upon insects that humans consider pests, such as the coffee-eating moth, L. coffeella. This ecological interaction is vitally important to human populations, as an unchecked infestation of L. coffeella can cause significant damage to coffee crops, reducing crop yields by up to 50%. Organophosphates, which are commonly used as insecticides for agricultural crops, are extremely toxic and have a large unintended effect on populations of P. sylveirae. Insecticides reduce the occurrence and effectiveness of many aspects of P. sylveirae behavior, including orientation, motility, feeding, oviposition, and learning.
