= Leucoptera coffeella =

Scientific classification
- Kingdom: Animalia
- Phylum: Arthropoda
- Clade: Pancrustacea
- Class: Insecta
- Order: Lepidoptera
- Family: Lyonetiidae
- Genus: Leucoptera
- Species: L. coffeella

Binomial name
- Leucoptera coffeella (Guérin-Méneville, 1842)

Synonyms
- Perileucoptera coffeella; Elachista coffeella Guérin-Méneville, 1842; Cemiostoma coffeella

Leucoptera coffeella (coffee leaf miner) is a moth in the family Lyonetiidae. It is found in every coffee-growing country in South America, Central America and the West Indies. It is considered one of the worst pest species of coffee, alongside the coffee bean borer.

The Leucoptera coffeella lays its eggs on the upper surface of leaves. The caterpillar/larvae, when hatching out of the eggs, burrow into the leaves and creates small mines. The caterpillar lives inside of this mine until it is ready to create its cocoon, when it burrows out. The cocoon is constructed of silk threads in the shape of an 'X' between leaves.

The wingspan is about 6.5 millimetres (0.26 in).

The larvae feed on Coffea arabica.

Predators of Leucoptera coffeella include Protonectarina sylveirae and Synoeca cyanea, social wasps found in Brazil.
