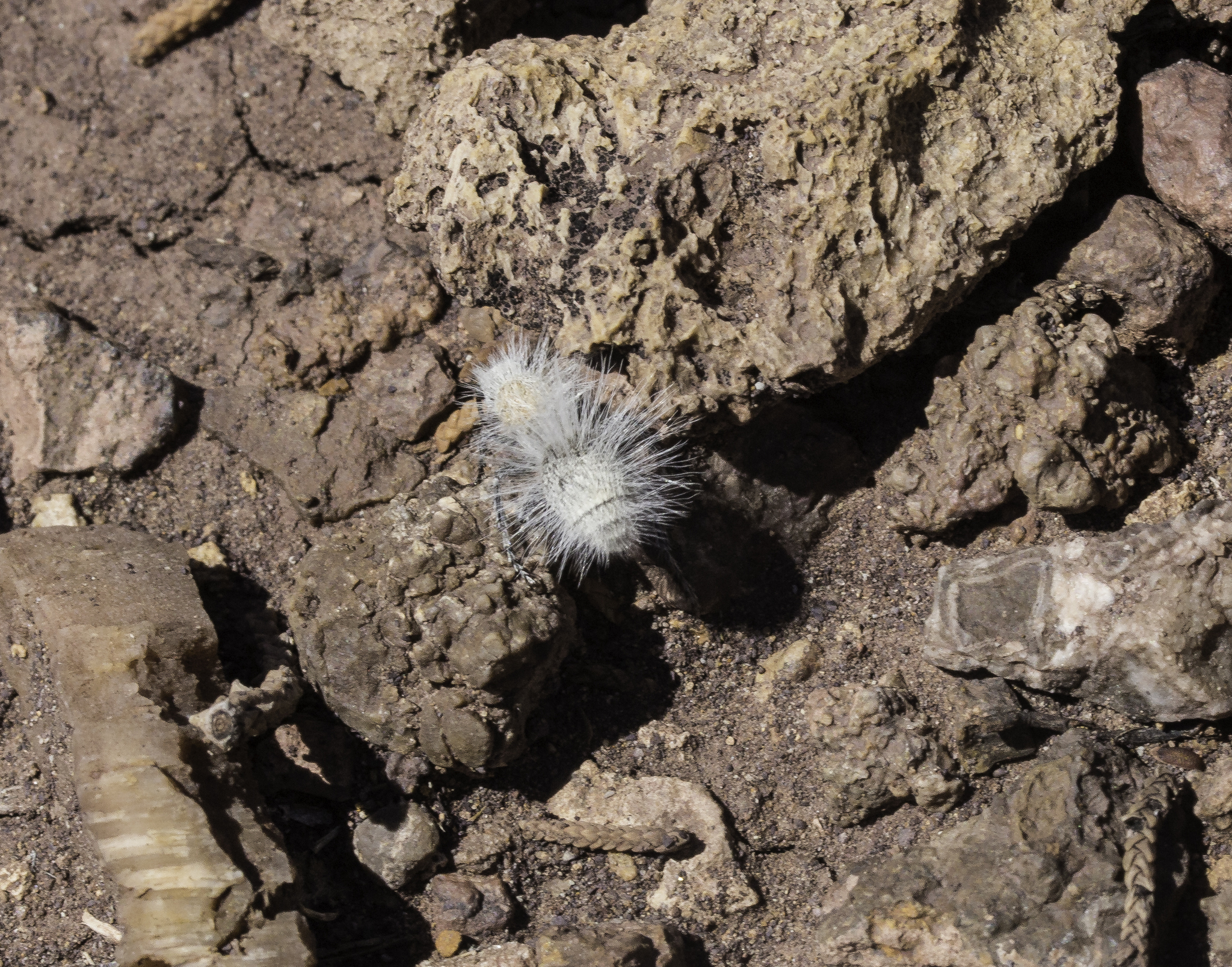

Scientific classification
- Domain: Eukaryota
- Kingdom: Animalia
- Phylum: Arthropoda
- Class: Insecta
- Order: Hymenoptera
- Family: Mutillidae
- Genus: Dasymutilla
- Species: D. pseudopappus

Binomial name
- Dasymutilla pseudopappus Cockerell, 1895

= Dasymutilla pseudopappus =

Species of velvet ant

Dasymutilla pseudopappus is a species of velvet ant native to North America. Dasymutilla pseudopappus is visually similar to and shares some range with Dasymutilla imperialis, Dasymutilla thetis, and Dasymutilla gloriosa. (D. pseudopappus was originally classed as a subspecies of D. gloriosa.) This species is found the southwest, namely in the Mexican states of Sinaloa, Sonora, Baja California, Baja California Sur, and Zacatecas, and in the Four Corners, California, and Texas in the U.S.
