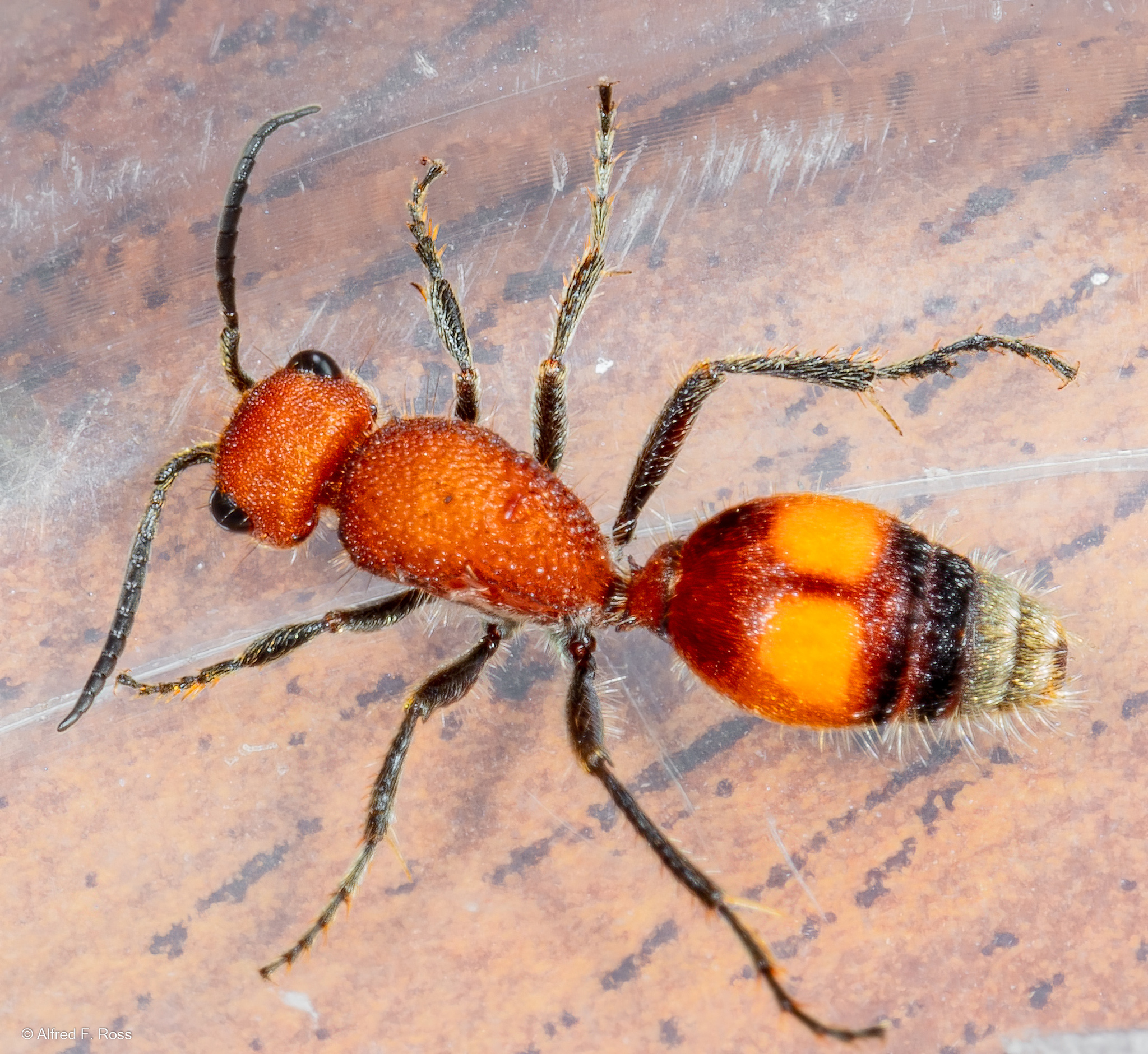

Scientific classification
- Domain: Eukaryota
- Kingdom: Animalia
- Phylum: Arthropoda
- Class: Insecta
- Order: Hymenoptera
- Family: Mutillidae
- Genus: Dasymutilla
- Species: D. gibbosa

Binomial name
- Dasymutilla gibbosa Say, 1836

= Dasymutilla gibbosa =

Species of velvet ant

Dasymutilla gibbosa is a species of velvet ant found in the northeastern United States in North America. C. E. Mickel placed D. gibbosa in the Quadriguttata group of the genus.
