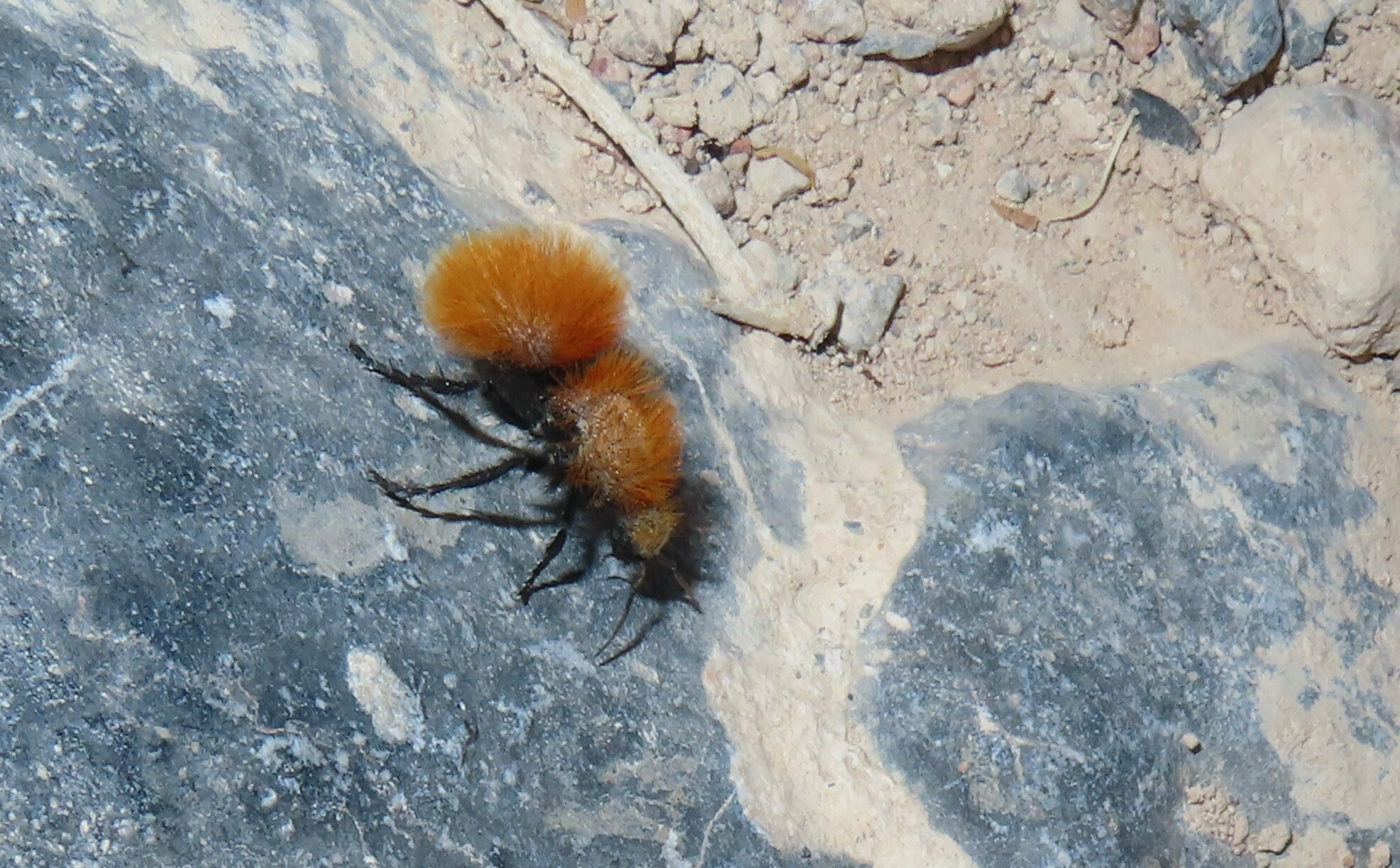

Scientific classification
- Domain: Eukaryota
- Kingdom: Animalia
- Phylum: Arthropoda
- Class: Insecta
- Order: Hymenoptera
- Family: Mutillidae
- Genus: Dasymutilla
- Species: D. satanas

Binomial name
- Dasymutilla satanas Mickel, 1928

= Dasymutilla satanas =

Species of velvet ant

Dasymutilla satanas, also known as Satan's velvet ant, is a species of velvet ant found in the deserts of the Great Basin region of North America. The name is most likely a reference to the "hellish" deserts where it dwells. The females of this species are relatively large for the genus, comparable to the size of Dasymutilla magna or Dasymutilla sackenii females.
