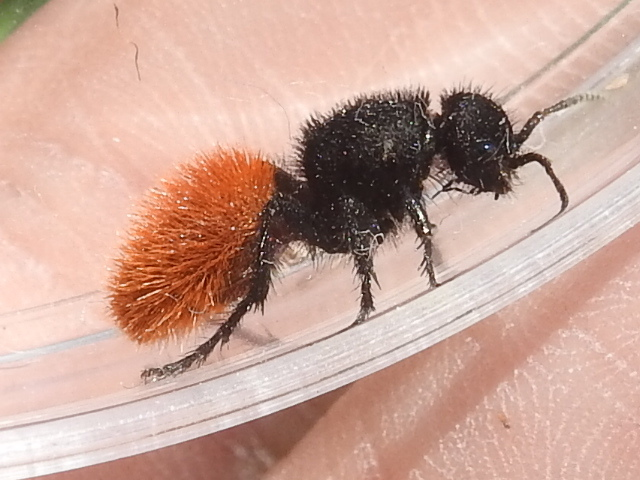

Scientific classification
- Domain: Eukaryota
- Kingdom: Animalia
- Phylum: Arthropoda
- Class: Insecta
- Order: Hymenoptera
- Family: Mutillidae
- Genus: Dasymutilla
- Species: D. nogalensis

Binomial name
- Dasymutilla nogalensis Mickel, 1928

= Dasymutilla nogalensis =

Species of velvet ant

Dasymutilla nogalensis is a species of velvet ant native to North America. The male and female of this species were originally described in 1928 by C. E. Mickel as Dasymutilla atrifulva and Dasymutilla nogalensis, respectively. The two species names were synonymized by Manley and Pitts in 2007. This species is found the southwest, namely the Mexican states of Sinaloa and Sonora, and the American states of Arizona and New Mexico.
