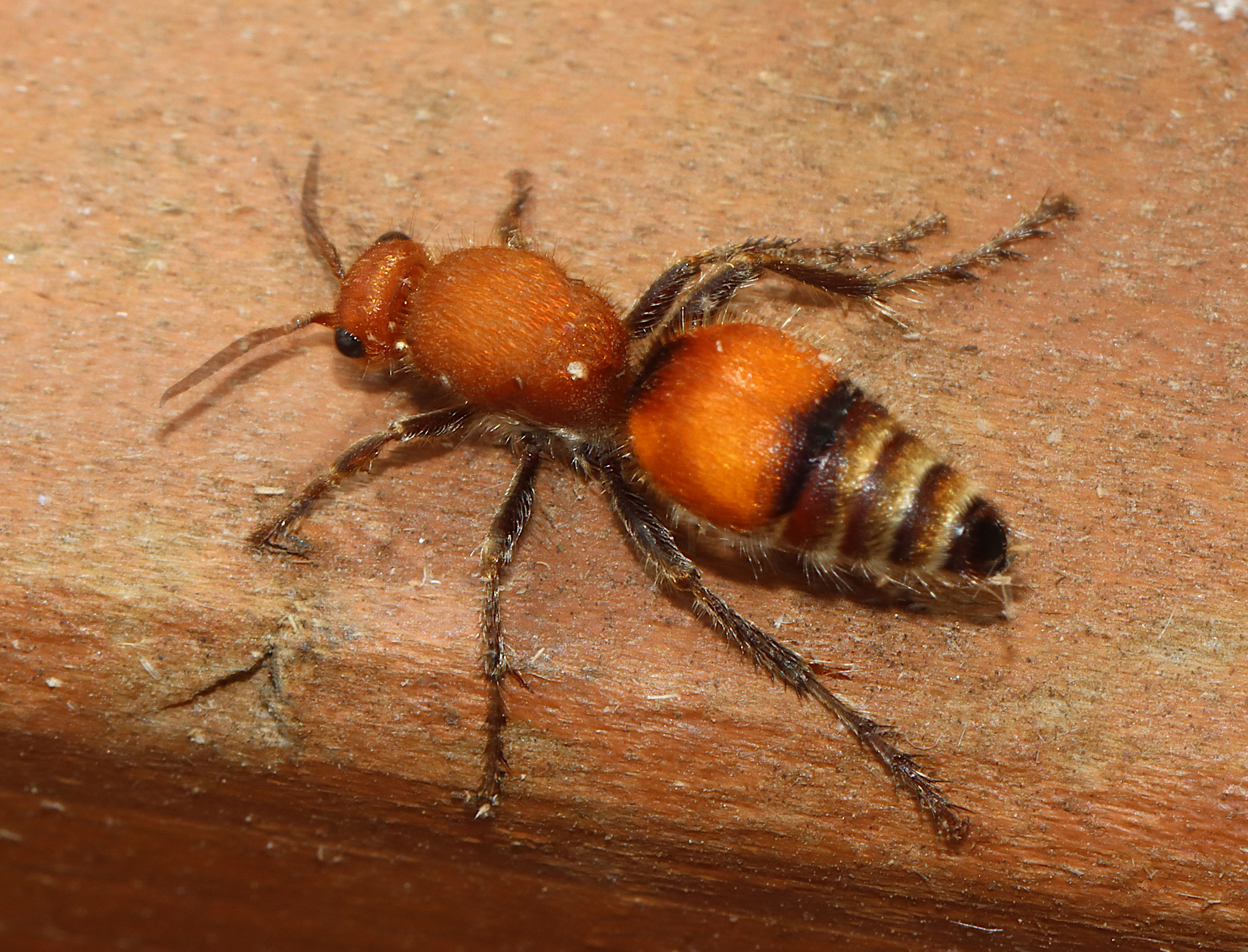

Scientific classification
- Domain: Eukaryota
- Kingdom: Animalia
- Phylum: Arthropoda
- Class: Insecta
- Order: Hymenoptera
- Family: Mutillidae
- Genus: Dasymutilla
- Species: D. bioculata

Binomial name
- Dasymutilla bioculata Cresson, 1865

= Dasymutilla bioculata =

Species of velvet ant

Dasymutilla bioculata is a species of velvet ant found in south-central North America, between roughly between the southern border of South Dakota and the northern border of Zacatecas. The specific name comes from the "two orange spots" on the second terga in males. Velvet ants are actually a type of parasitic wasp; Dasymutilla bioculata females lays their eggs inside the cocoons of other wasps. Males of this species are very difficult to visually distinguish from Dasymutilla quadriguttata and Dasymutilla vesta males. This species has 21 binonimal synonyms.
