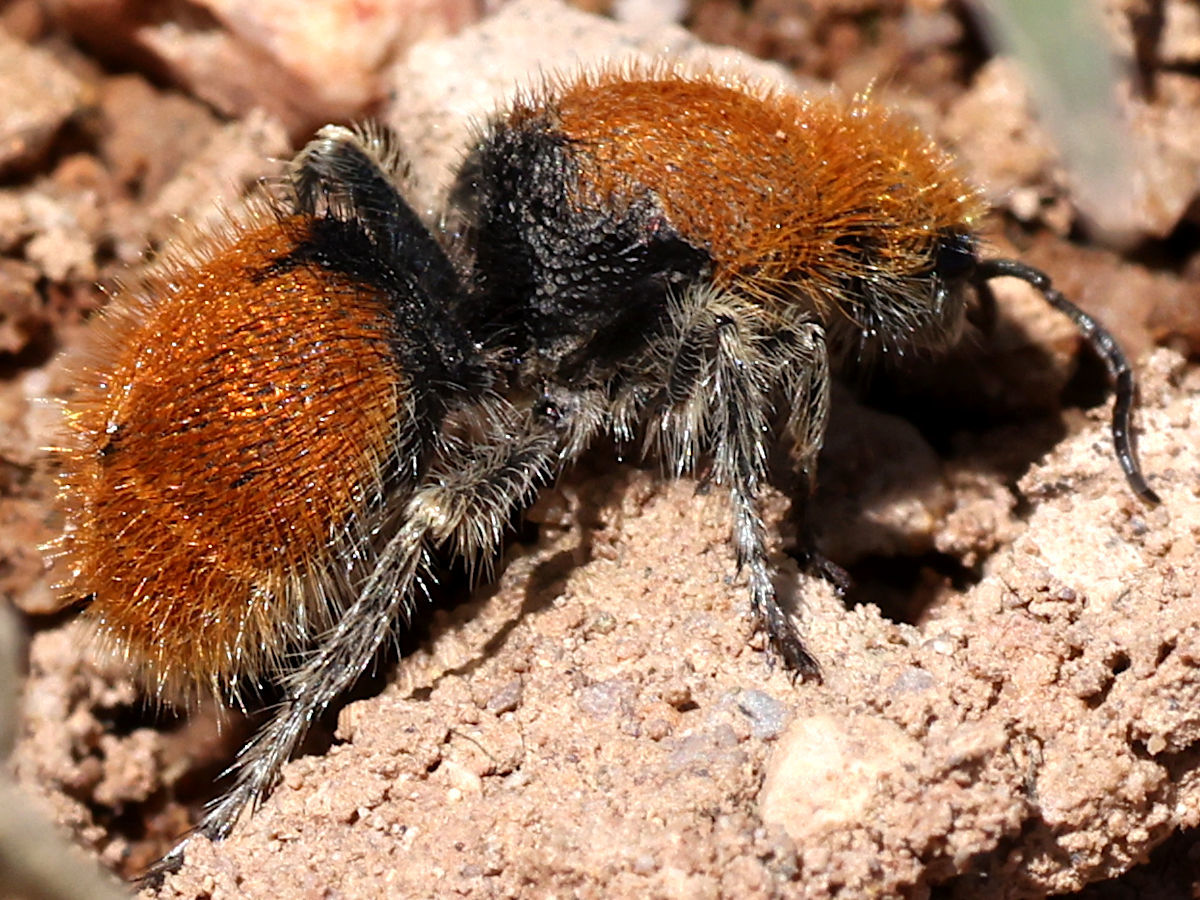
- Wingless female

Scientific classification
- Kingdom: Animalia
- Phylum: Arthropoda
- Clade: Pancrustacea
- Class: Insecta
- Order: Hymenoptera
- Family: Mutillidae
- Genus: Dasymutilla
- Species: D. eminentia

Binomial name
- Dasymutilla eminentia (Mickel, 1928)

= Dasymutilla eminentia =

Species of wasp

Dasymutilla eminentia is a species of parasitoid wasp in the family Mutillidae. Members of this family of wasps are often mistaken for true ants, especially since females are wingless. Unlike ants, however, their bodies are covered by a dense pile of velvet-like hair, and they lack petiole nodes.

The species is found in desert or arid regions of Southwestern United States and Mexico.
