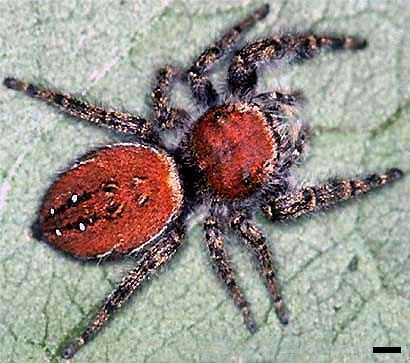
- Female cardinal jumper

Scientific classification
- Kingdom: Animalia
- Phylum: Arthropoda
- Subphylum: Chelicerata
- Class: Arachnida
- Order: Araneae
- Infraorder: Araneomorphae
- Family: Salticidae
- Genus: Phidippus
- Species: P. cardinalis

Binomial name
- Phidippus cardinalis (Hentz, 1845)

Synonyms
- Attus cardinalis Attus rufus Phidippus bivittatus Attus m'cookii Phidippus ruber Phidippus mccooki Phidippus aureopilosus Dendryphantes ruber Dendryphantes cardinalis Phidippus oaklandensis Dendryphantes aureopilosus Dendryphantes mccooki Phidippus maccocki

= Phidippus cardinalis =

Species of spider

Phidippus cardinalis is a species of jumping spider. It is commonly called cardinal jumper. It is one of the species of jumping spiders which are mimics of mutillid wasps in the genus Dasymutilla (commonly known as "velvet ants"); several species of these wasps are similar in size and coloration to the spiders, and possess a very painful sting.

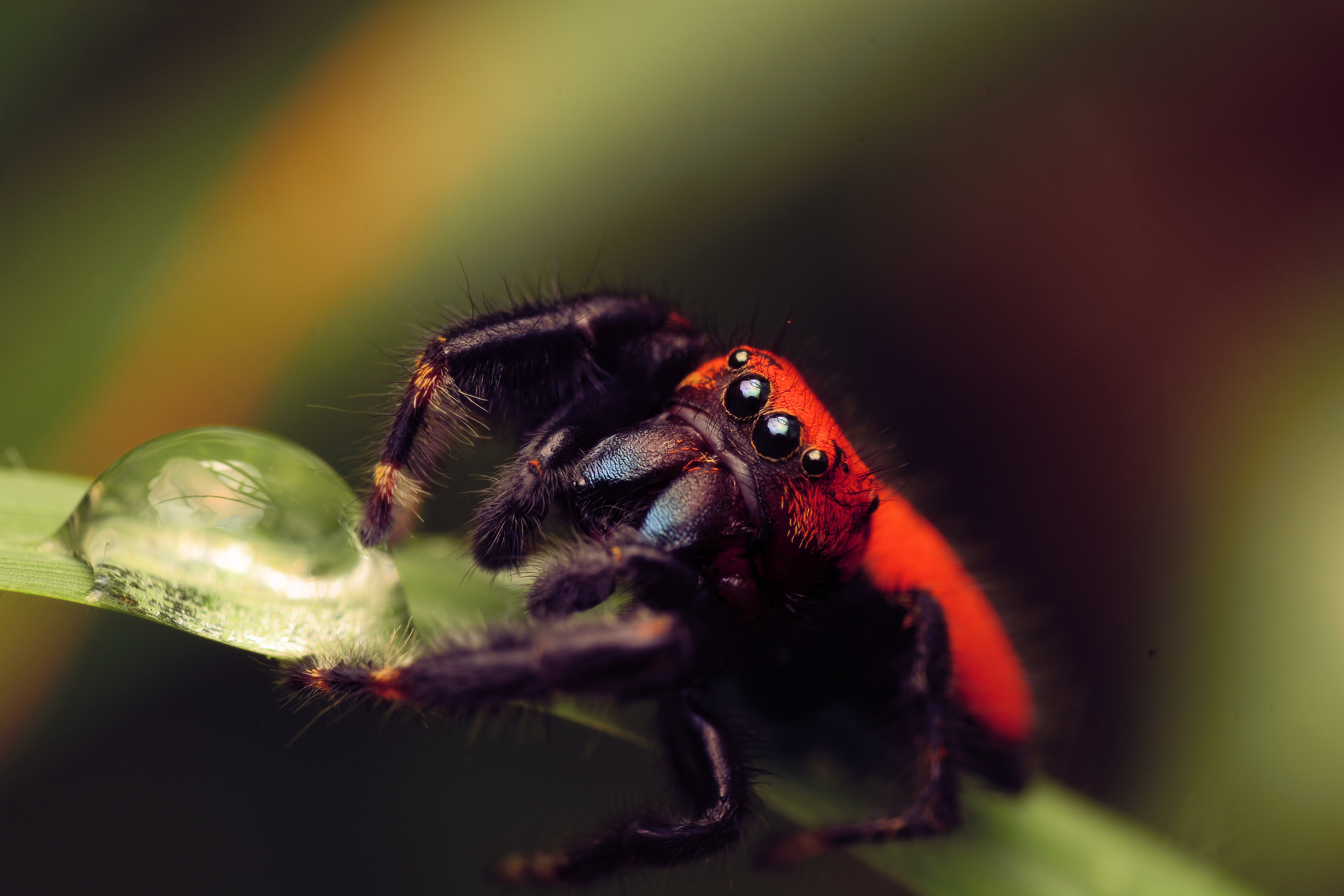
Male face

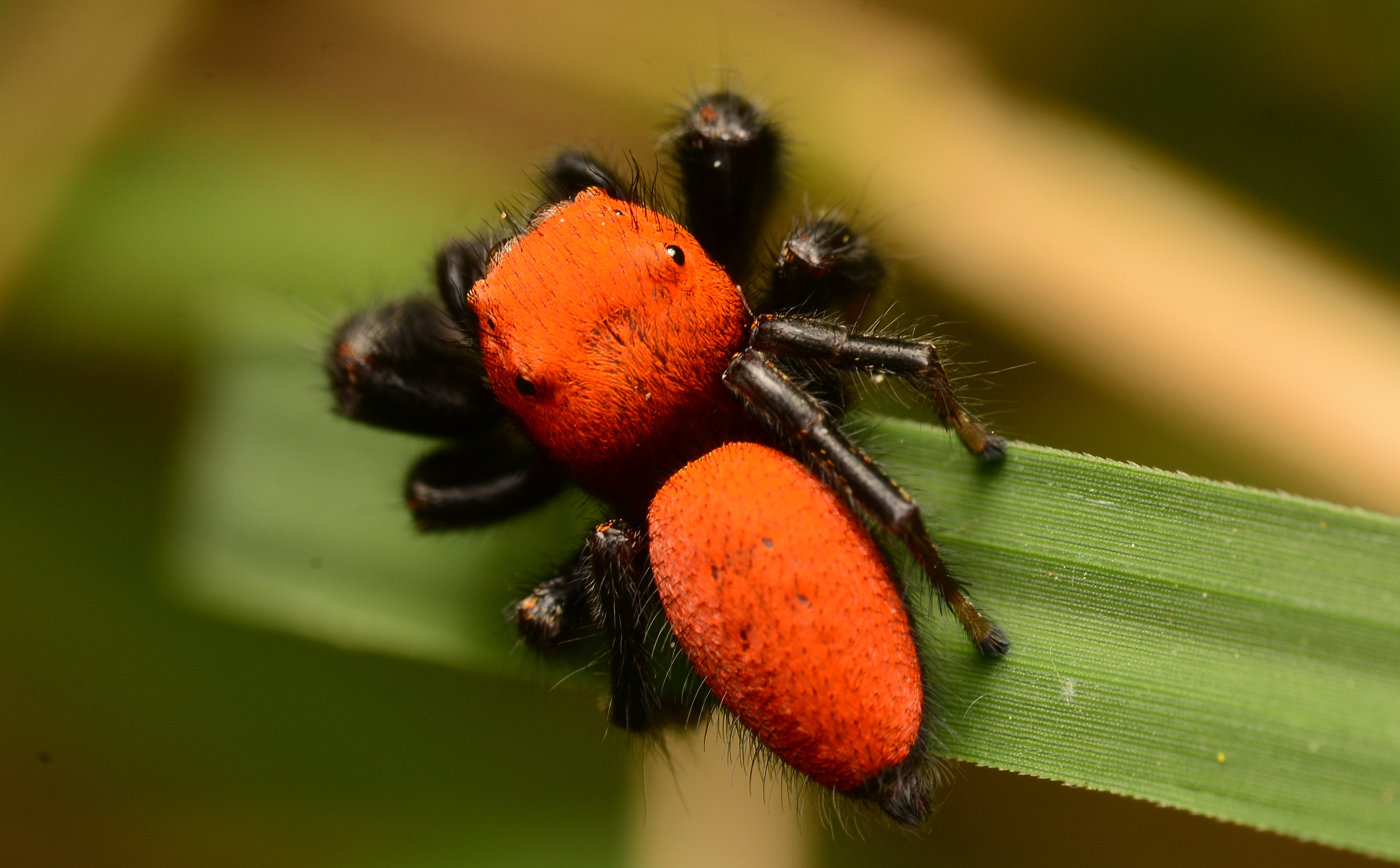
Male dorsal

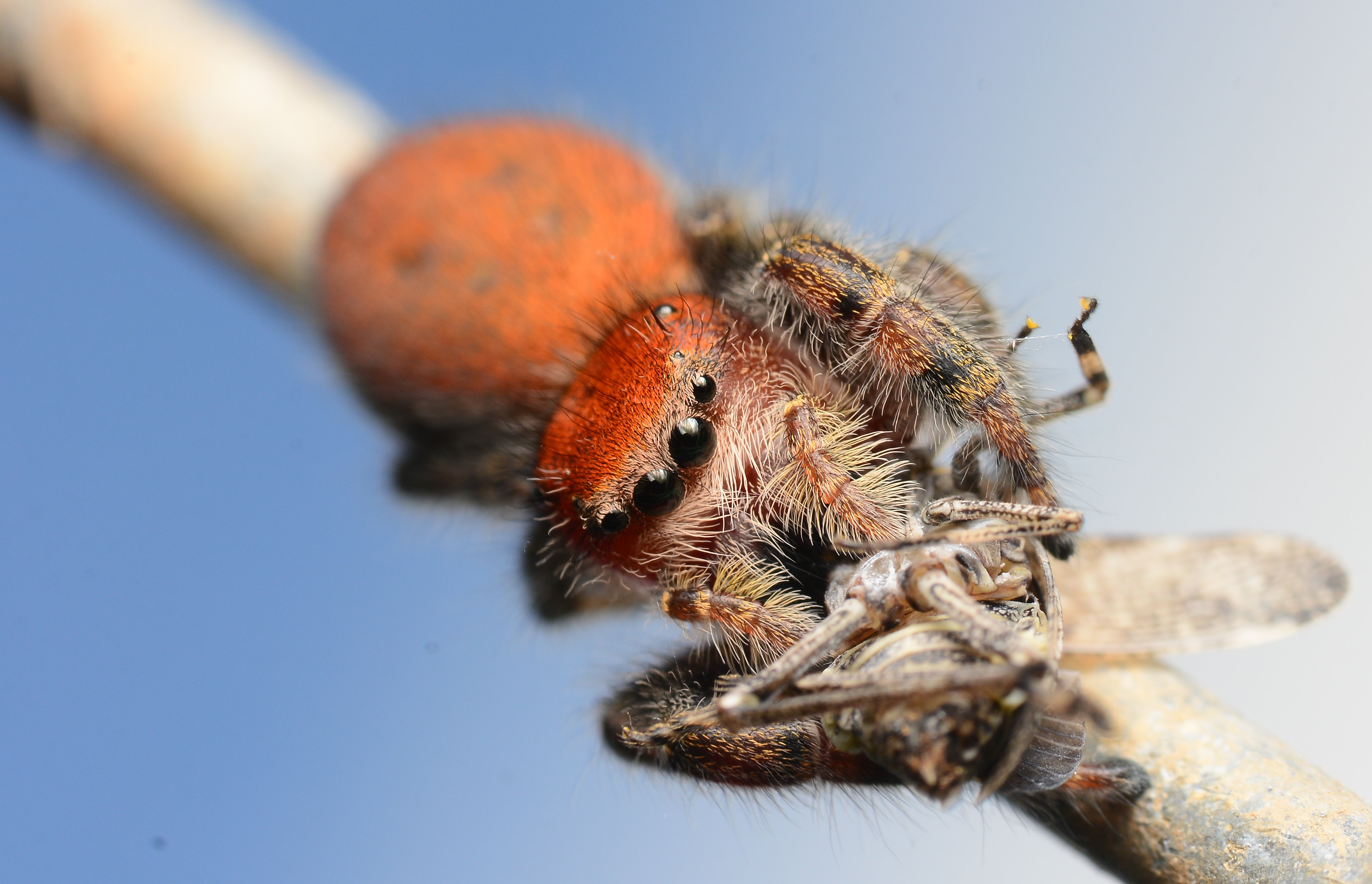
Female face

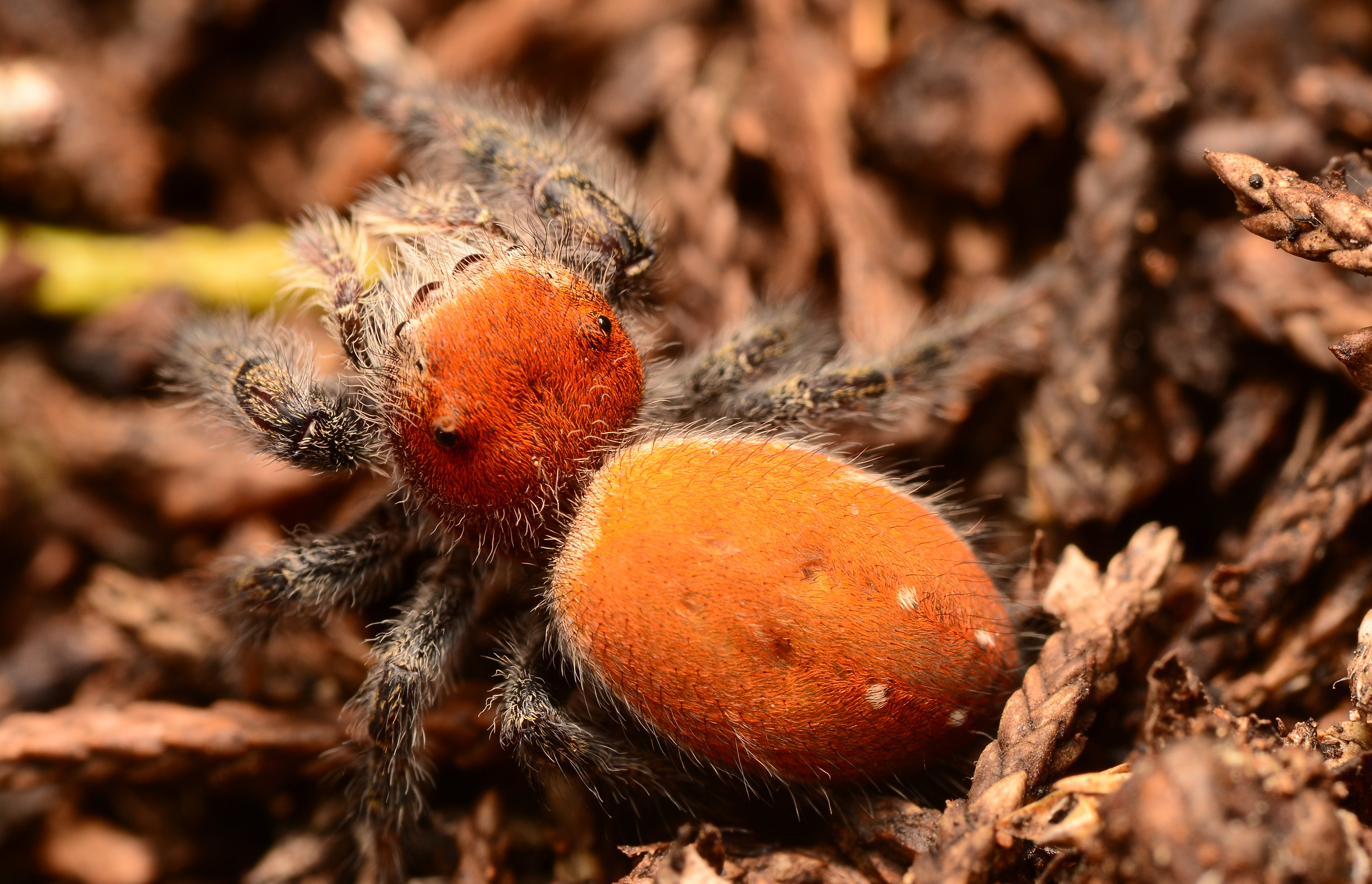
Female dorsal

== Distribution ==
Phidippus cardinalis occurs in the southern and eastern United States and Mexico, and possibly Panama. It has also been confirmed in Western, Central, and Northern Colorado.
