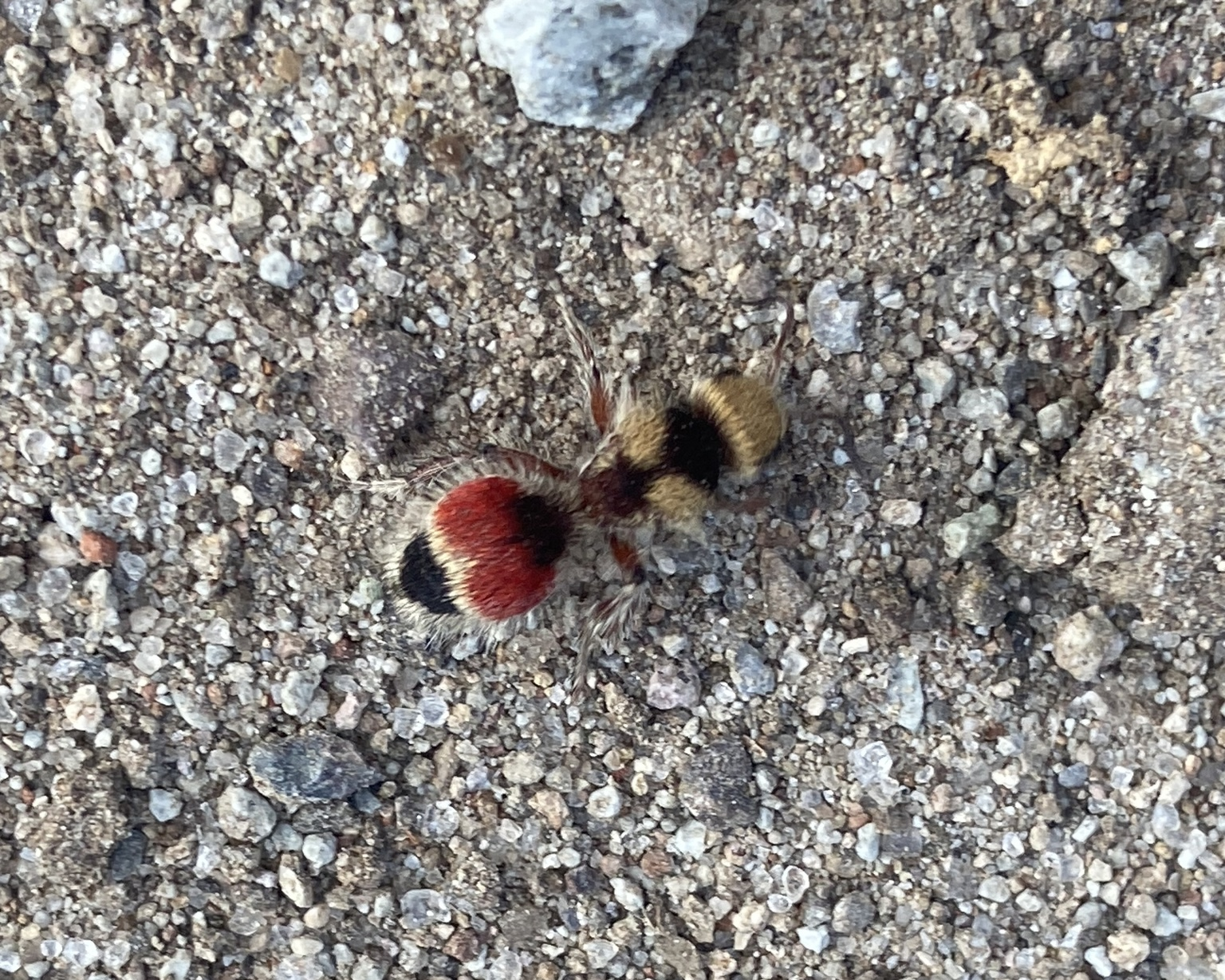

Scientific classification
- Domain: Eukaryota
- Kingdom: Animalia
- Phylum: Arthropoda
- Class: Insecta
- Order: Hymenoptera
- Family: Mutillidae
- Genus: Dasymutilla
- Species: D. foxi

Binomial name
- Dasymutilla foxi Cockerell, 1894

= Dasymutilla foxi =

Species of velvet ant

Dasymutilla foxi is a species of velvet ant found in Mexico and the southwestern United States. Dasymutilla foxi is locally common, and "setal coloration is highly variable; each of the body segments varies from whitish to reddish, and most eastern populations (Colorado, Kansas, Texas) have a black setal patch on the mesosoma."

This species was first described by entomologist Theodore D. A. Cockerell and is named for William J. Fox. Dasymutilla phoenix and Dasymutilla dugesii have been synonymized with this species. According to C. E. Mickel in 1928, "The females vary in size from 5 to 11 mm...A note on two of the specimens collected by Cockerell states that this species is parasitic in the nests of Diadasia species."
