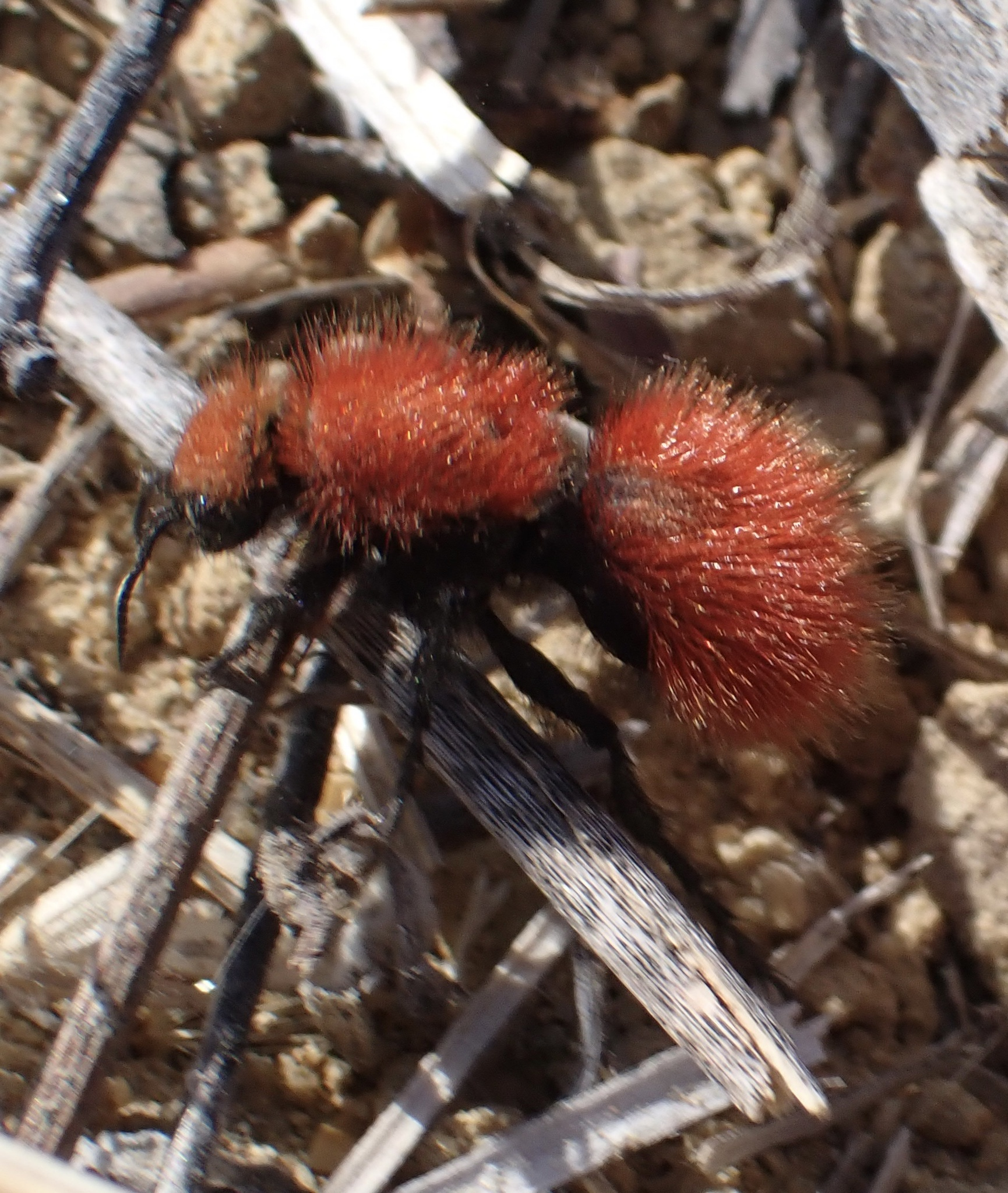

Scientific classification
- Domain: Eukaryota
- Kingdom: Animalia
- Phylum: Arthropoda
- Class: Insecta
- Order: Hymenoptera
- Family: Mutillidae
- Genus: Dasymutilla
- Species: D. flammifera

Binomial name
- Dasymutilla flammifera Mickel, 1928

= Dasymutilla flammifera =

Species of velvet ant

Dasymutilla flammifera is a species of velvet ant found along the Pacific coast of North America and inland to Idaho and Arizona.

This species was first described by American entomologist Clarence E. Mickel in 1928. Per Mickel, D. flammifera females are "very dark mahogany red, the pubescence of the head, thorax, and abdomen above scarlet; length, 13 mm" and are similar to Dasymutilla sackenii except for "the sculpture of the genae," coloration, and the fuzz on the femora. The type species was collected near Claremont, California.
