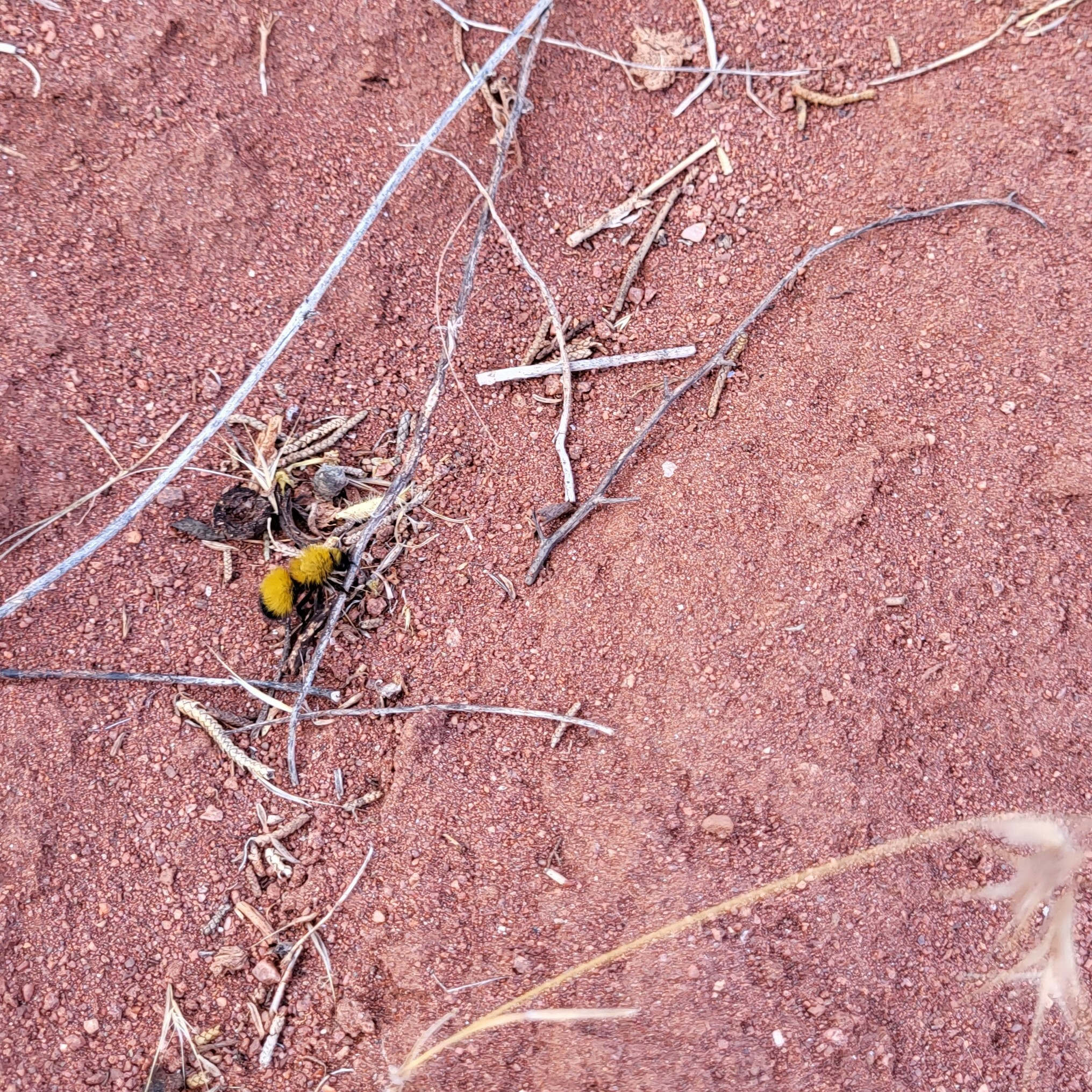

Scientific classification
- Domain: Eukaryota
- Kingdom: Animalia
- Phylum: Arthropoda
- Class: Insecta
- Order: Hymenoptera
- Family: Mutillidae
- Genus: Dasymutilla
- Species: D. scitula

Binomial name
- Dasymutilla scitula Mickel, 1928

= Dasymutilla scitula =

Species of velvet ant

Dasymutilla scitula is a species of velvet ant native to North America. This species is "restricted to the Great Basin ecoregion," and the females must be carefully distinguished from Dasymutilla arenivaga.
