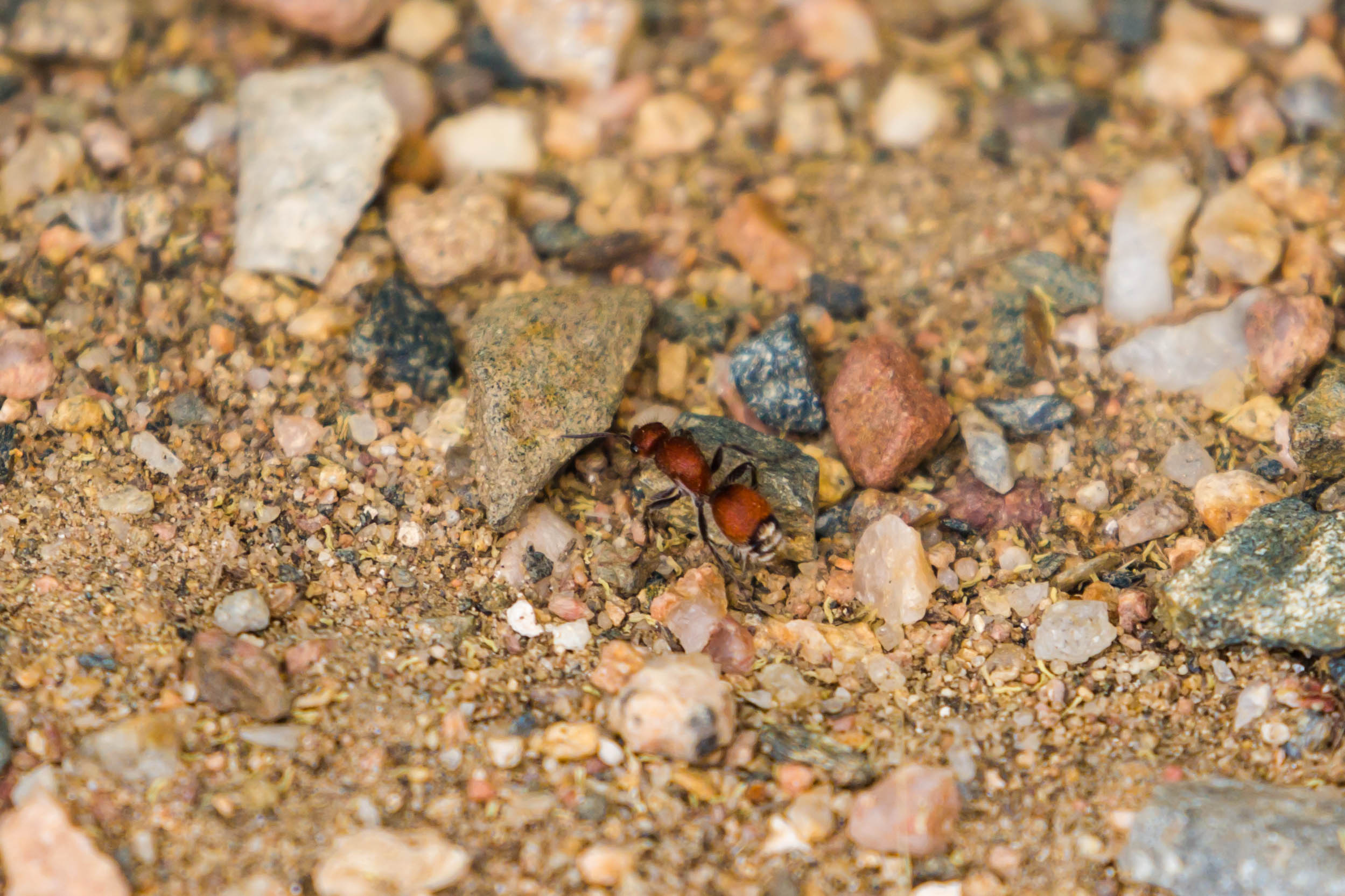

Scientific classification
- Kingdom: Animalia
- Phylum: Arthropoda
- Class: Insecta
- Order: Hymenoptera
- Family: Mutillidae
- Genus: Dasymutilla
- Species: D. ursus

Binomial name
- Dasymutilla ursus (Fabricius, 1793)

Synonyms
- Mutilla Vesta (Cresson 1865b); Dasymutilla vesta (Cresson); Scolia unicincta Provancher 1882; Mutilla monozona Dalla Torre 1897; Mutilla sappho Fox 1899; Mutilla agenor Fox 1899; Mutilla zella Rohwer 1910; Pycnomutilla harmoniiformis Rohwer 1912; Dasymutilla errans Rohwer 1912; Dasymutilla bosquensis Rohwer 1912; Dasymutilla ferrugatella Rohwer 1912; Dasymutilla coloradella Rohwer 1912; Dasymutilla coloradella virginica Rohwer 1912; Dasymutilla coloradella kamloopsensis Rohwer 1912; Dasymutilla texensis Rohwer 1912; Dasymutilla mesillae Rohwer 1912; Dasymutilla carolina Rohwer 1912; Dasymutilla columbiana Mickel 1928

= Dasymutilla ursus =

Species of insect

Dasymutilla ursus is a species of velvet ant. This species is widespread throughout North America.
