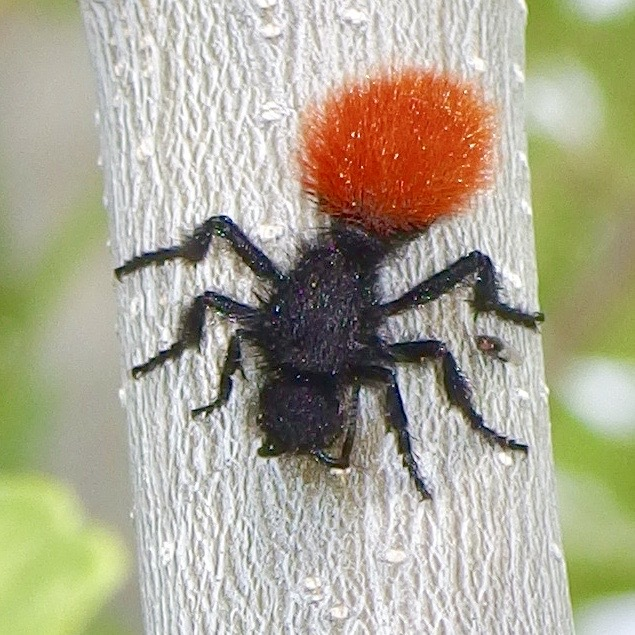

Scientific classification
- Domain: Eukaryota
- Kingdom: Animalia
- Phylum: Arthropoda
- Class: Insecta
- Order: Hymenoptera
- Family: Mutillidae
- Genus: Dasymutilla
- Species: D. magnifica

Binomial name
- Dasymutilla magnifica Mickel, 1928

= Dasymutilla magnifica =

Species of velvet ant

Dasymutilla magnifica, also known as the magnificent velvet ant, is a species of velvet ant found in Mojave and Sonoran deserts, and in the Arizona mountains, in the Great Basin region of North America. Field identification of this species is difficult because it is very similar in size and coloration to Dasymutilla klugii, which has a partially overlapping range.
