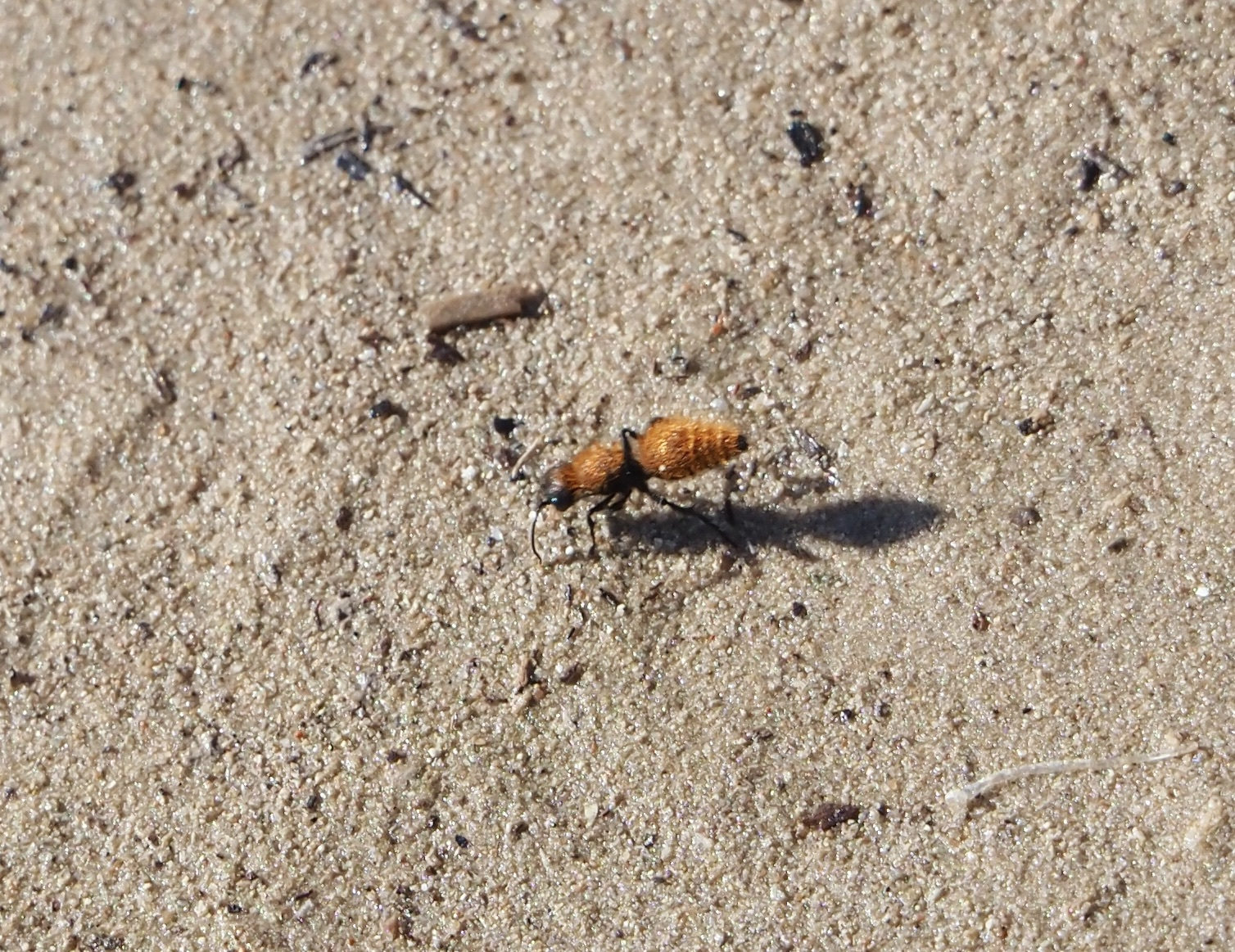

Scientific classification
- Domain: Eukaryota
- Kingdom: Animalia
- Phylum: Arthropoda
- Class: Insecta
- Order: Hymenoptera
- Family: Mutillidae
- Genus: Dasymutilla
- Species: D. stevensi

Binomial name
- Dasymutilla stevensi Mickel, 1928

= Dasymutilla stevensi =

Species of velvet ant

Dasymutilla stevensi is a species of velvet ant native to North America. This species is not common but is known from the drylands of the continent from North Dakota south to Guanajuato. The species is named for his colleague O. A. Stevens who collected the type species in Medora, North Dakota.
