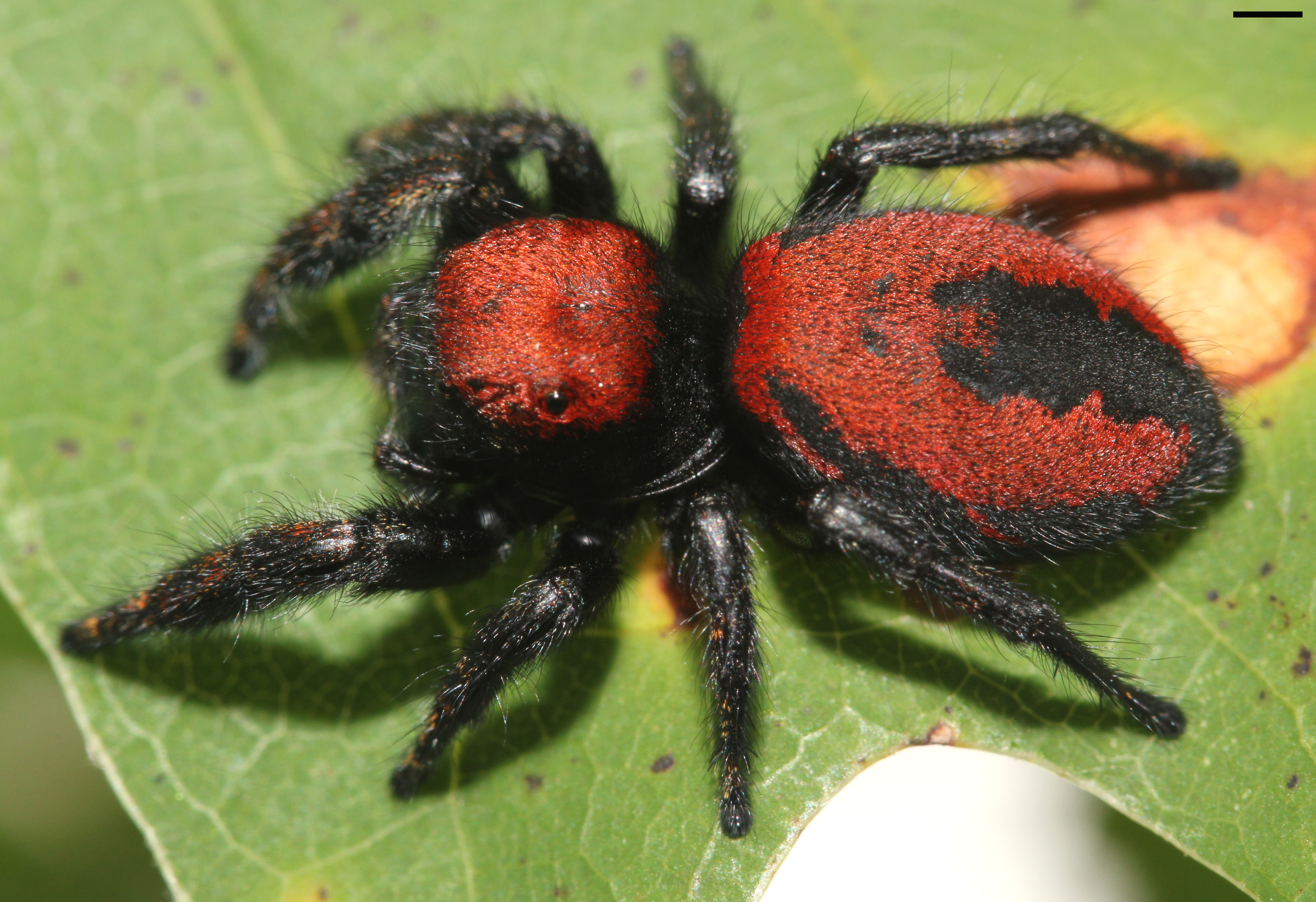
- Female
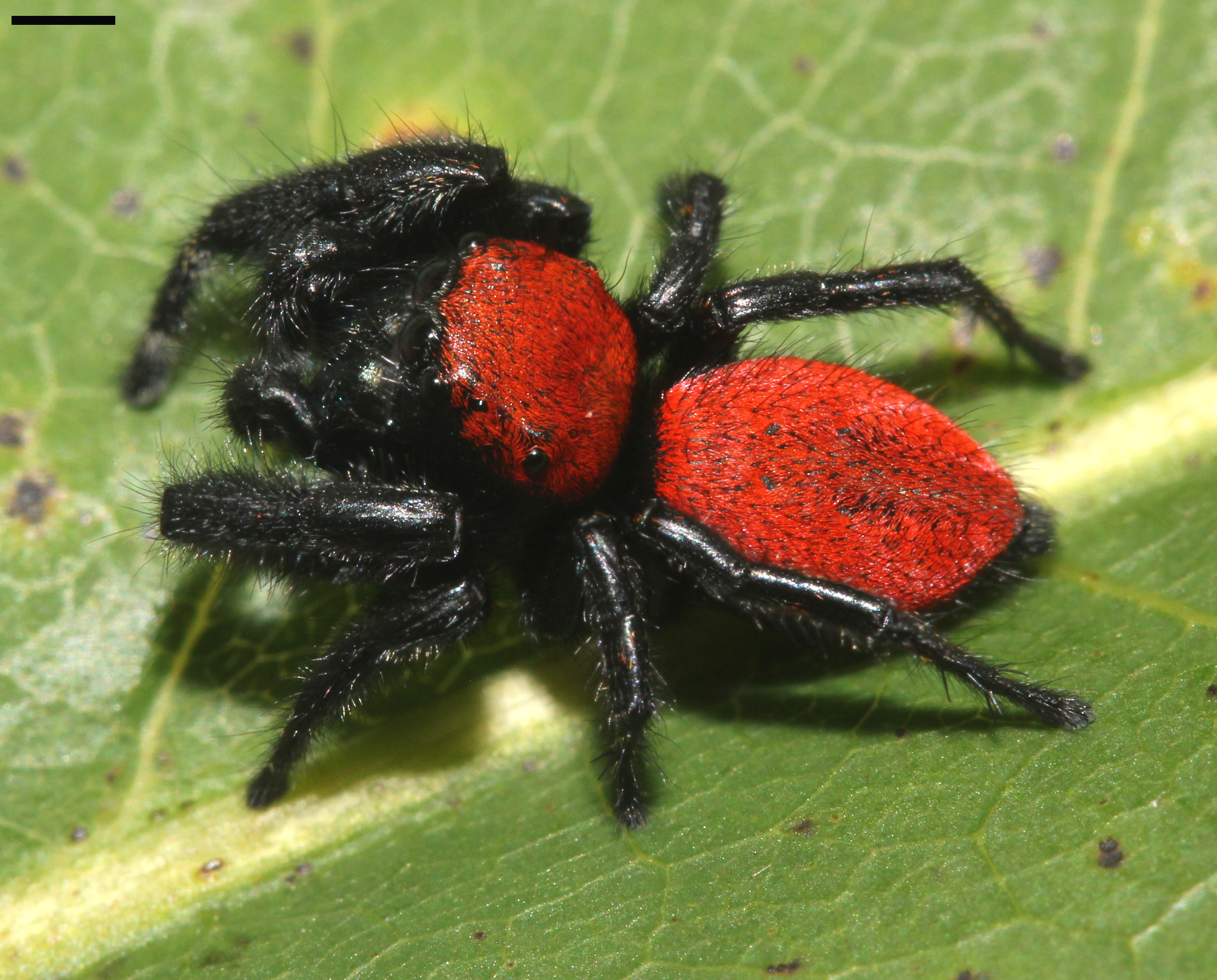
- Male

Scientific classification
- Kingdom: Animalia
- Phylum: Arthropoda
- Subphylum: Chelicerata
- Class: Arachnida
- Order: Araneae
- Infraorder: Araneomorphae
- Family: Salticidae
- Genus: Phidippus
- Species: P. apacheanus

Binomial name
- Phidippus apacheanus Chamberlin & Gertsch, 1929

= Phidippus apacheanus =

Species of spider

Phidippus apacheanus, or the Apache jumping spider, is a species of jumping spider in the family Salticidae. It is found in the United States, Mexico, and Cuba.

== Description ==
It is large for a jumping spider. Small males of this species measure 3.3 mm (0.13 in) and large females can measure up to 22 mm (0.87 in). They are black with some orange, red or yellow coloration on top. Females usually have a black line on the abdomen. The chelicarae are green and iridescent. It is thought they are mimics of the western velvet ant Dasymutilla flammifera or the Mutillidae family as a whole, both mimicking their coloration and their general shape.

== Courtship display ==
These spiders have an interesting courtship display. The male first holds his carapace high, shifting his abdomen to one side and raising the first pair of legs. In this position he advances in a zigzag, stopping every few steps, shifting his abdomen to the opposite side after each approach. While doing this the male flicks his pedipalps up and down, first holding them far apart, and slowly closing them together as he approaches. He then does this until the tips touch and form a circle. The female, if receptive, will do an acceptance dance; the male then cautiously touches her.

The acceptance dance of the female involves her having the pedipalps high and far apart, with the abdomen to the side. The female then sways before the male, sometimes going side to side. After this dance the male climbs over the female, and using his pedipalps to help her turn her abdomen. Then the male inserts his pedipalp to her genital pore.

== Distribution ==
This species has been observed in the United States, Mexico and Cuba, usually being found between 500 and 1,800 m (1,600 and 5,900 ft) above sea level. They are found in a great variety of habitats, such as grasslands, fields and deserts.
