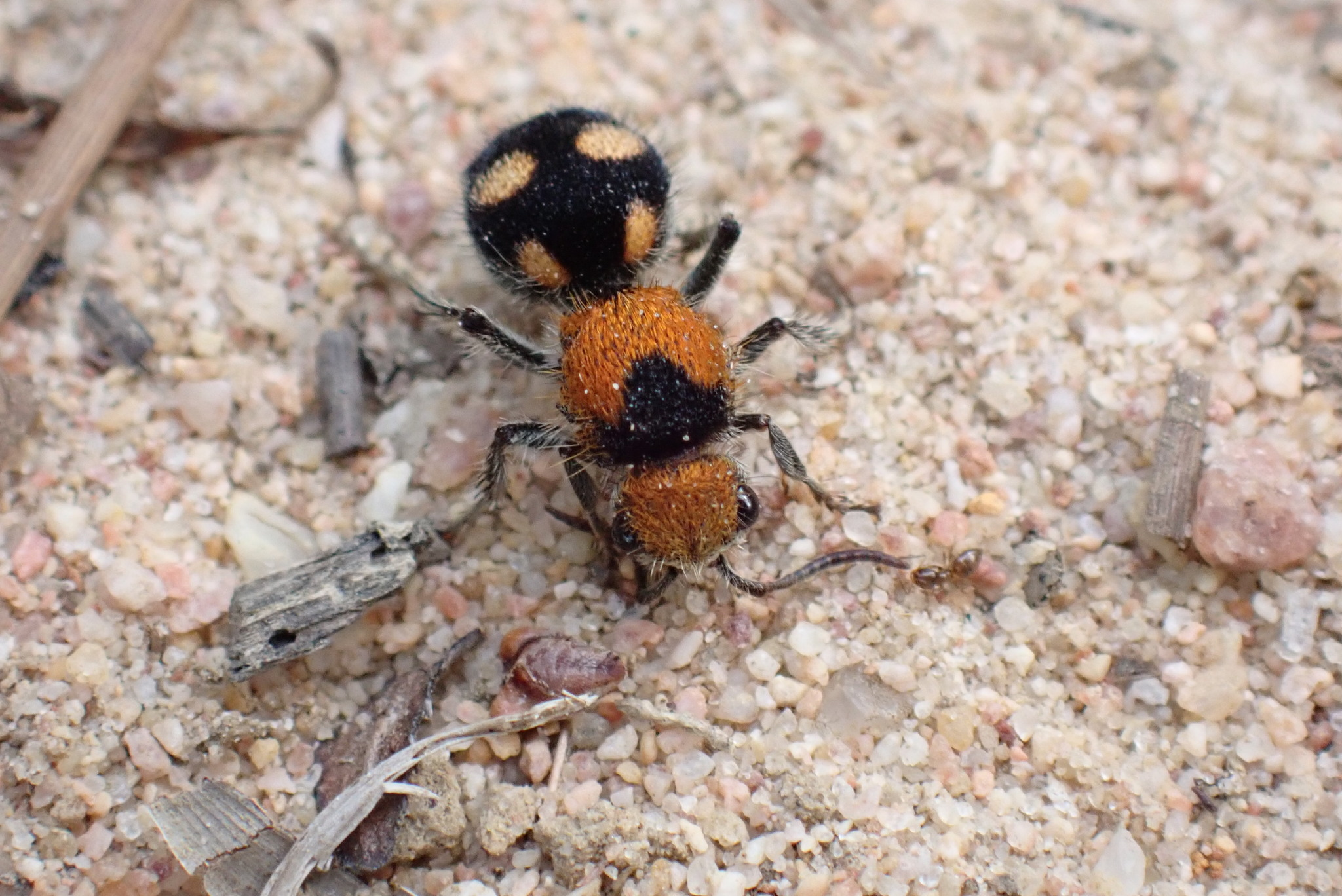

Scientific classification
- Domain: Eukaryota
- Kingdom: Animalia
- Phylum: Arthropoda
- Class: Insecta
- Order: Hymenoptera
- Family: Mutillidae
- Genus: Dasymutilla
- Species: D. munifica

Binomial name
- Dasymutilla munifica F. Smith, 1879

= Dasymutilla munifica =

Species of velvet ant

Dasymutilla munifica is a species of velvet ant found in eastern and southern Mexico, and throughout Central America. This species was first described by Frederick Smith in 1879. It is nearly identical to Dasymutilla proclea "except for coloration".
