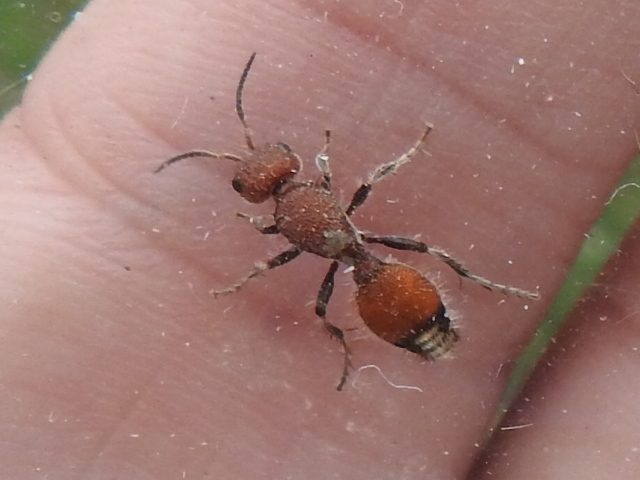

Scientific classification
- Domain: Eukaryota
- Kingdom: Animalia
- Phylum: Arthropoda
- Class: Insecta
- Order: Hymenoptera
- Family: Mutillidae
- Genus: Dasymutilla
- Species: D. creon

Binomial name
- Dasymutilla creon Blake, 1872

= Dasymutilla creon =

Species of velvet ant

Dasymutilla creon is a species of velvet ant found in North America. Specimens have been collected from Kansas south to Texas and as far east as North Carolina.
