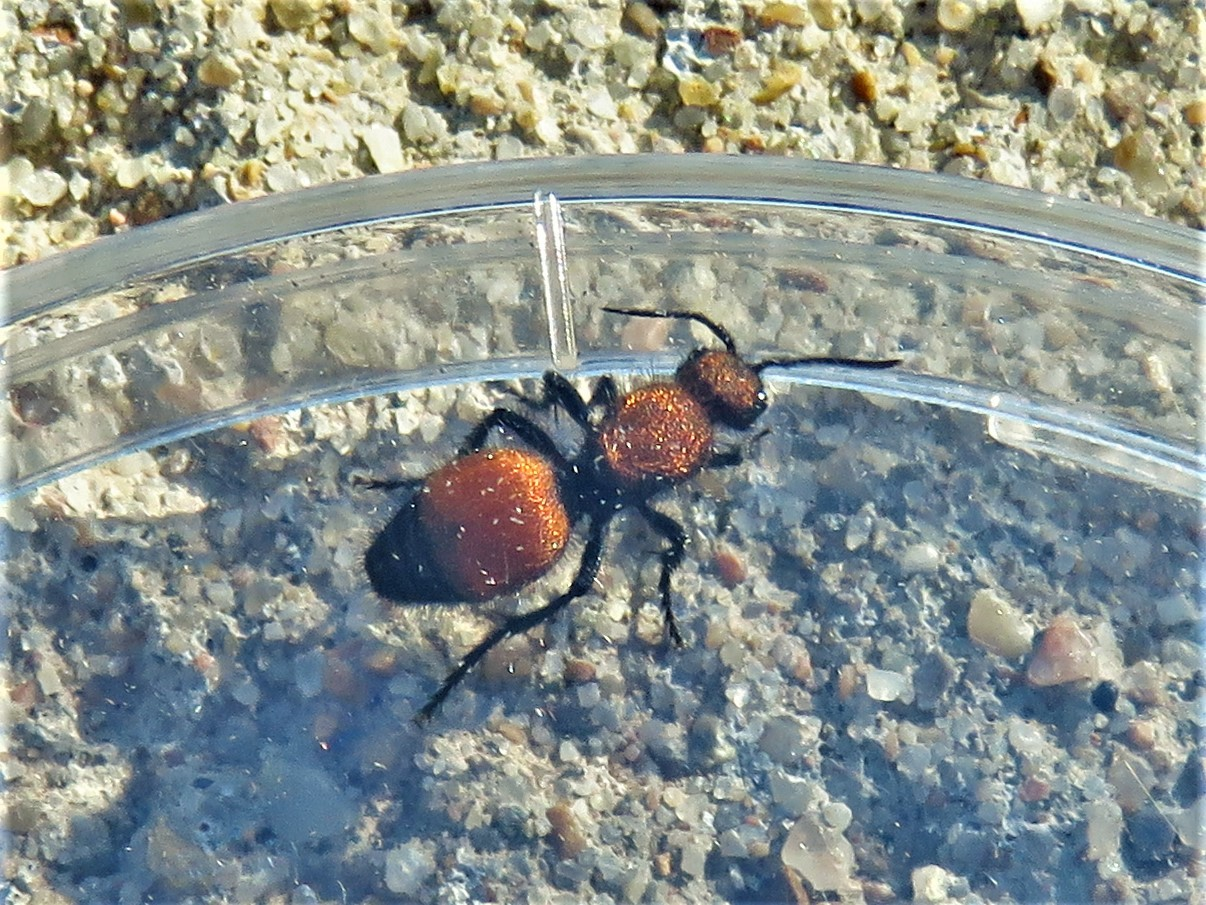

Scientific classification
- Domain: Eukaryota
- Kingdom: Animalia
- Phylum: Arthropoda
- Class: Insecta
- Order: Hymenoptera
- Family: Mutillidae
- Genus: Dasymutilla
- Species: D. montivagoides

Binomial name
- Dasymutilla montivagoides Viereck, 1906

= Dasymutilla montivagoides =

Species of velvet ant

Dasymutilla montivagoides is a species of velvet ant native to North America. The species is found in the central United States, specifically Texas, New Mexico, Oklahoma, and Kansas.
