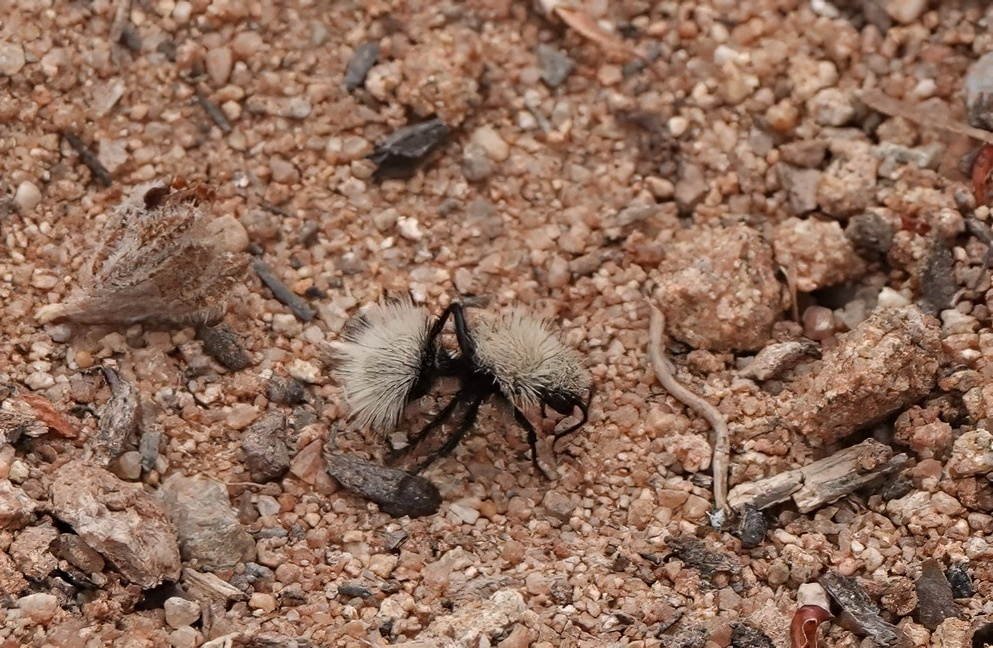

Scientific classification
- Domain: Eukaryota
- Kingdom: Animalia
- Phylum: Arthropoda
- Class: Insecta
- Order: Hymenoptera
- Family: Mutillidae
- Genus: Dasymutilla
- Species: D. coccineohirta

Binomial name
- Dasymutilla coccineohirta Blake, 1871

= Dasymutilla coccineohirta =

Species of velvet ant

Dasymutilla coccineohirta is a species of velvet ant found in North America. Coloration of the "fuzz" (seta) on the females is variable, ranging from red to white. It is found along the Pacific coast as far north as Washington and Idaho and as far south as Baja California state.

Dasymutilla clytemnestra was recently synonymized with D. coccineohirta. It is similar to Dasymutilla fulvohirta, but "may be distinguished by the marginal cell being smaller and the clothing much coarser."

This species was first described by Charles Alfred Blake in 1871 from a specimen collected in California.
