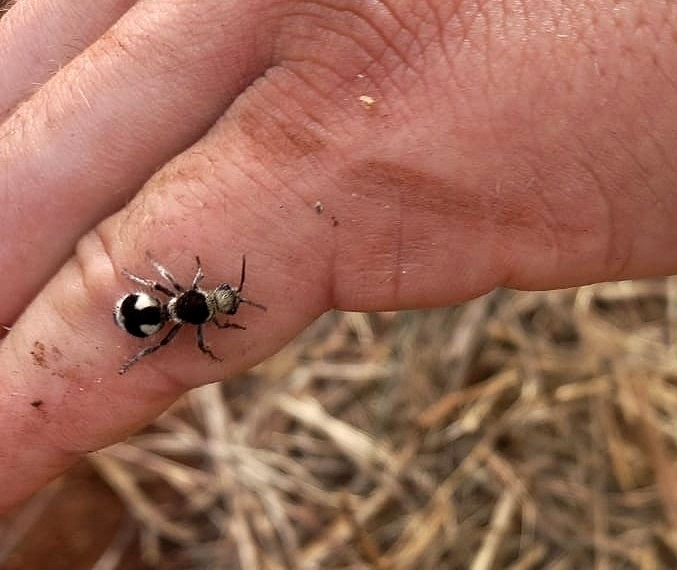

Scientific classification
- Domain: Eukaryota
- Kingdom: Animalia
- Phylum: Arthropoda
- Class: Insecta
- Order: Hymenoptera
- Family: Mutillidae
- Genus: Dasymutilla
- Species: D. arachnoides

Binomial name
- Dasymutilla arachnoides Smith, 1855

= Dasymutilla arachnoides =

Species of velvet ant

Dasymutilla arachnoides is a species of velvet ant found in North America. The female displays a "trifoliate pattern of black setae on tergum II." This species is widespread in Mexico and Central America as far south as Honduras.
