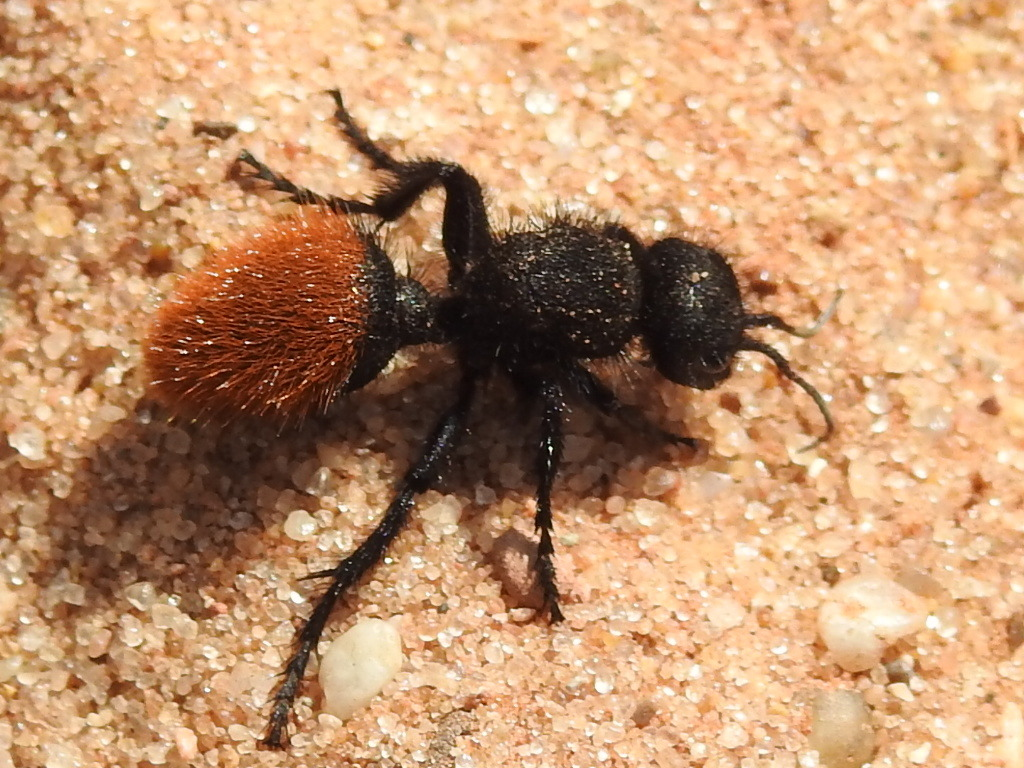

Scientific classification
- Domain: Eukaryota
- Kingdom: Animalia
- Phylum: Arthropoda
- Class: Insecta
- Order: Hymenoptera
- Family: Mutillidae
- Genus: Dasymutilla
- Species: D. gorgon

Binomial name
- Dasymutilla gorgon Blake, 1871

= Dasymutilla gorgon =

Species of velvet ant

Dasymutilla gorgon is a species of velvet ant native to central North America from Colorado to Louisiana.
