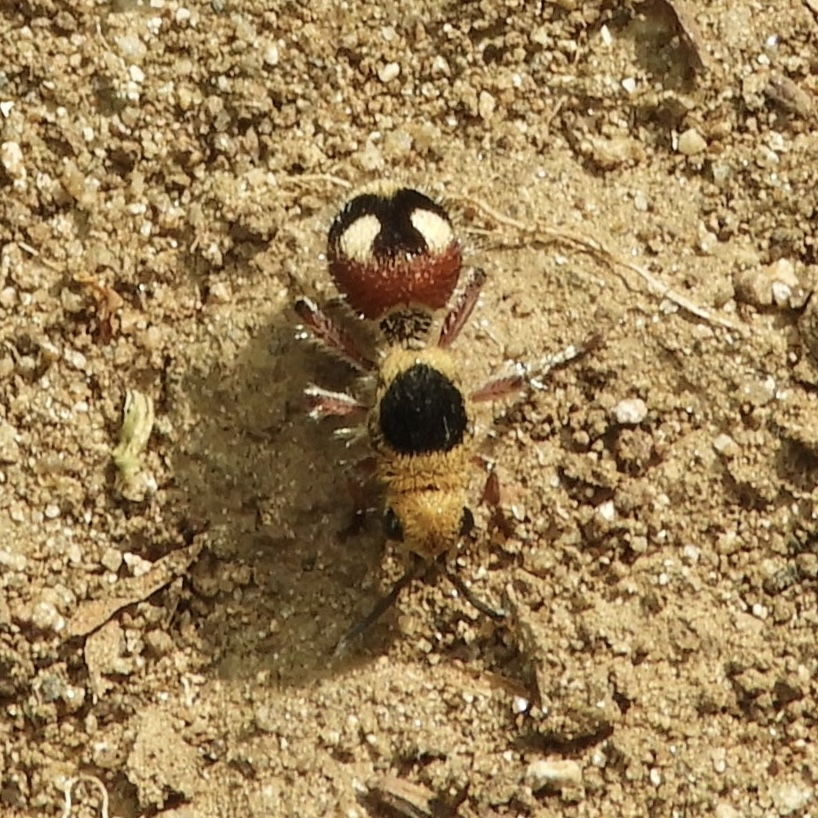

Scientific classification
- Domain: Eukaryota
- Kingdom: Animalia
- Phylum: Arthropoda
- Class: Insecta
- Order: Hymenoptera
- Family: Mutillidae
- Genus: Dasymutilla
- Species: D. sicheliana

Binomial name
- Dasymutilla sicheliana Saussure, 1868

= Dasymutilla sicheliana =

Species of velvet ant

Dasymutilla sicheliana is a species of velvet ant found predominantly in Mexico and the U.S. state of Arizona.
