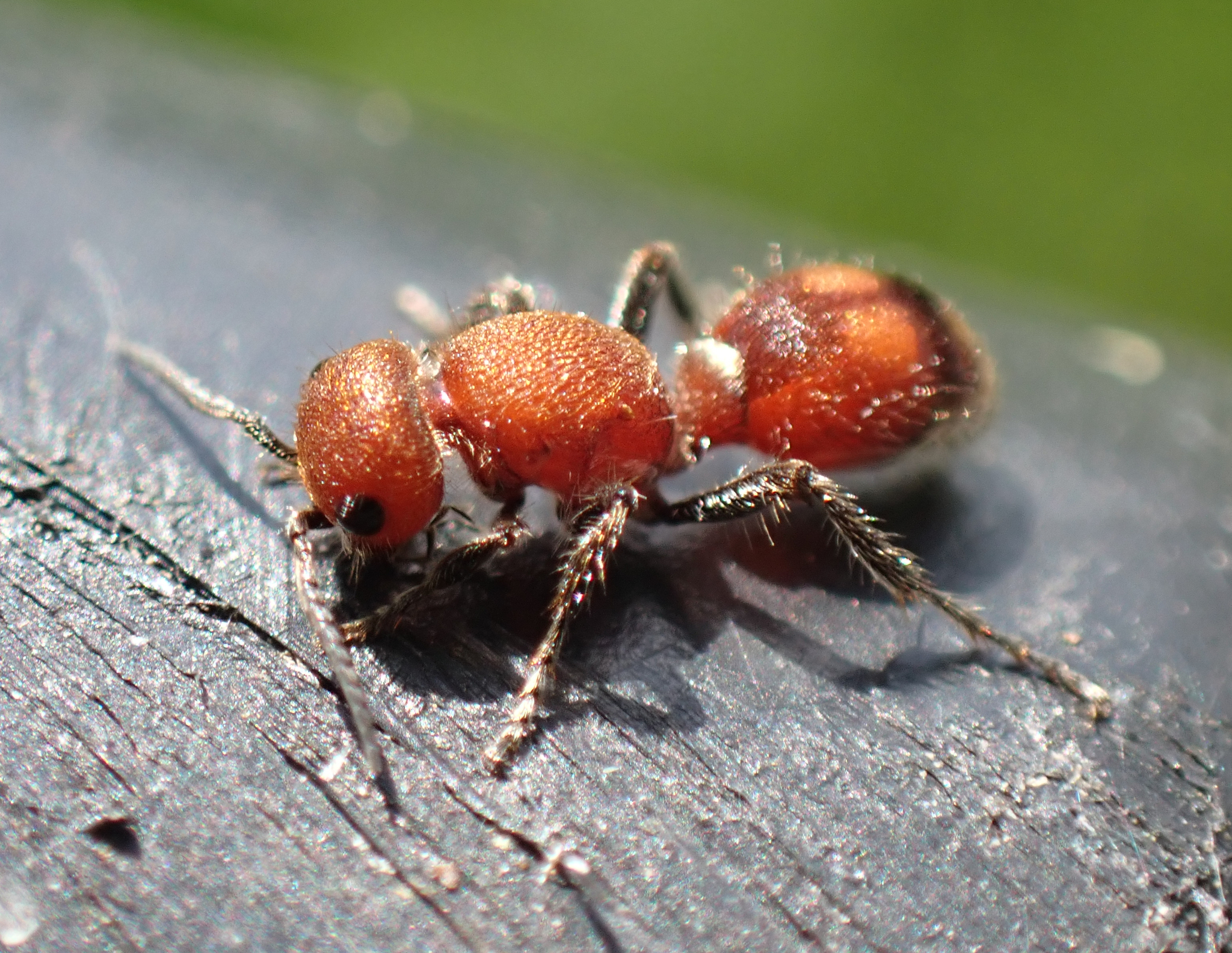
- Female
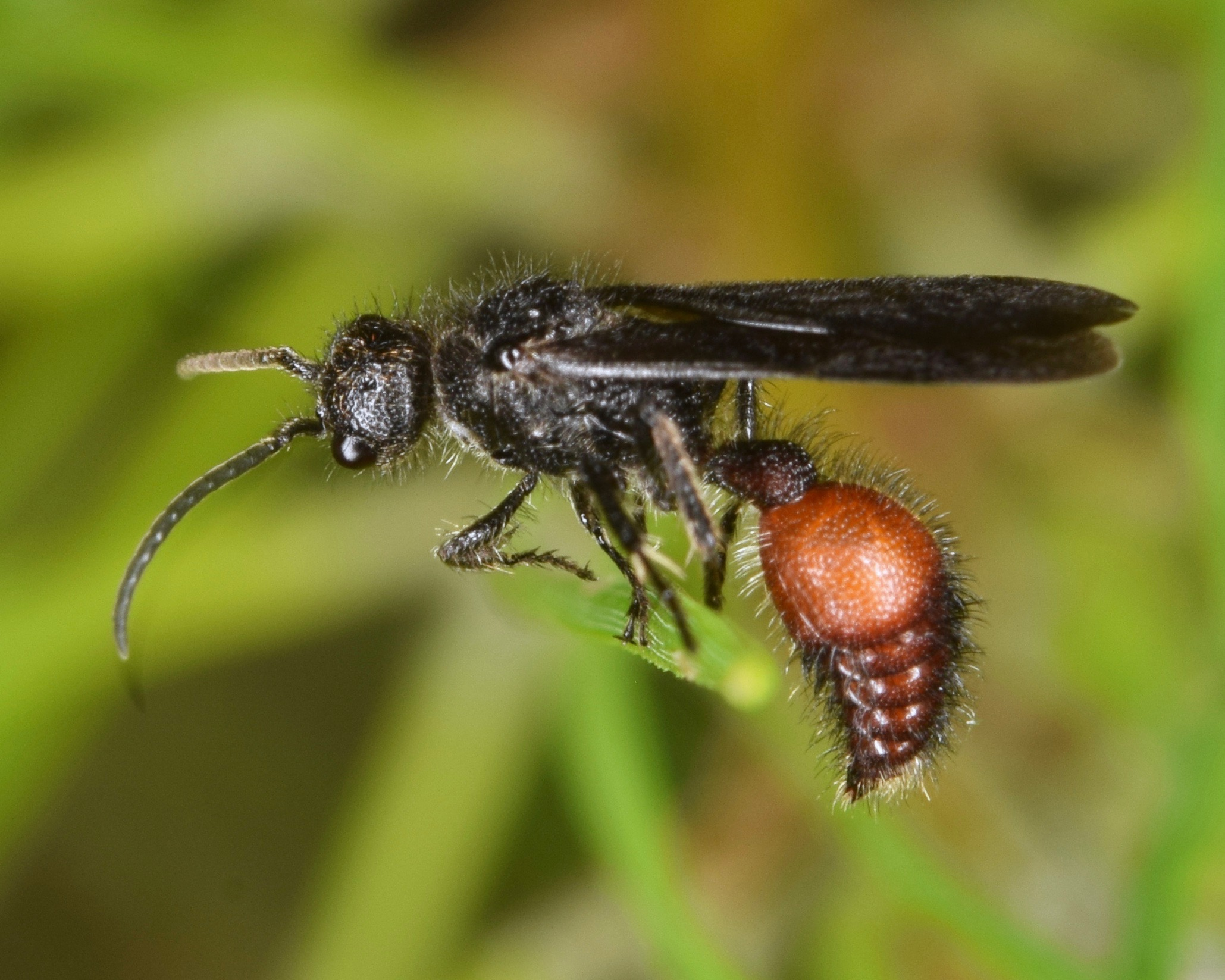
- Male

Scientific classification
- Domain: Eukaryota
- Kingdom: Animalia
- Phylum: Arthropoda
- Class: Insecta
- Order: Hymenoptera
- Family: Mutillidae
- Genus: Dasymutilla
- Species: D. scaevola

Binomial name
- Dasymutilla scaevola Blake, 1871

= Dasymutilla scaevola =

Species of velvet ant

Dasymutilla scaevola is a species of velvet ant native to North America. This species is "widely distributed and common," and is found on the eastern half of the continent.
