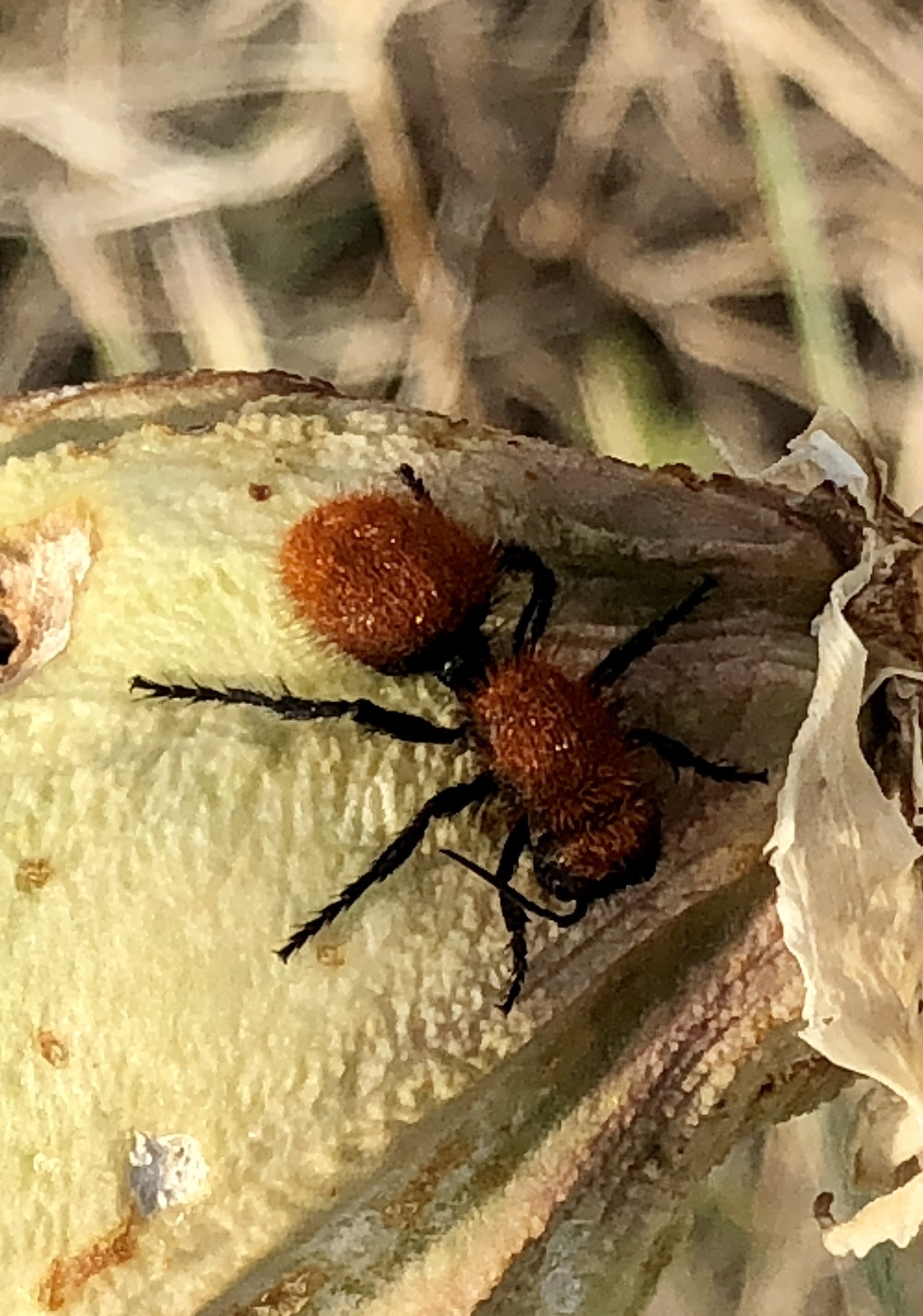

Scientific classification
- Kingdom: Animalia
- Phylum: Arthropoda
- Class: Insecta
- Order: Hymenoptera
- Family: Mutillidae
- Genus: Dasymutilla
- Species: D. leda

Binomial name
- Dasymutilla leda Blake, 1872

= Dasymutilla leda =

Species of velvet ant

Dasymutilla leda is a species of velvet ant native to North America. Found in the central United States from South Dakota to Texas, only females have been collected by scientists but "distribution and coloration suggest that D. myrice may be the male of this species."
