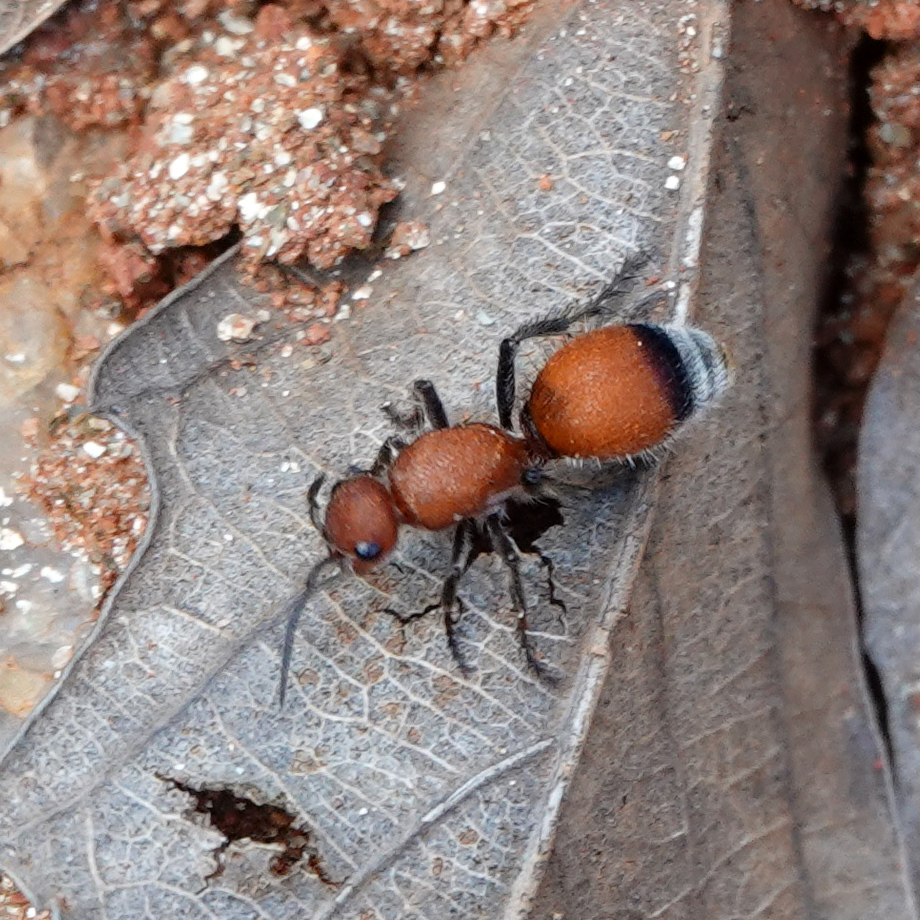
- Female
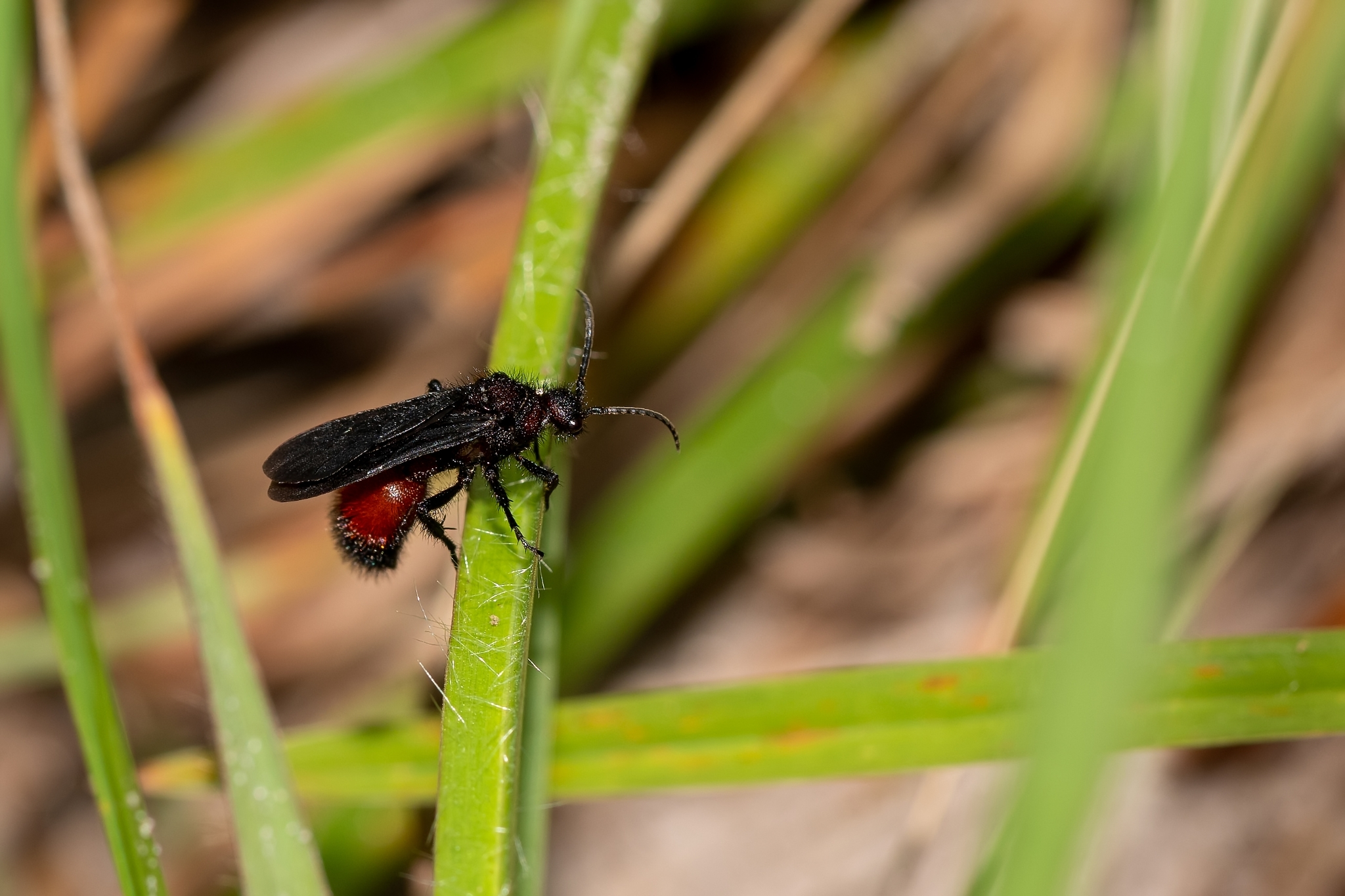
- Male

Scientific classification
- Domain: Eukaryota
- Kingdom: Animalia
- Phylum: Arthropoda
- Class: Insecta
- Order: Hymenoptera
- Family: Mutillidae
- Genus: Dasymutilla
- Species: D. nigripes

Binomial name
- Dasymutilla nigripes Fabricius, 1787

= Dasymutilla nigripes =

Species of velvet ant

Dasymutilla nigripes is a species of velvet ant native to North America. This species is widespread throughout the United States and is also found in Alberta in Canada.
