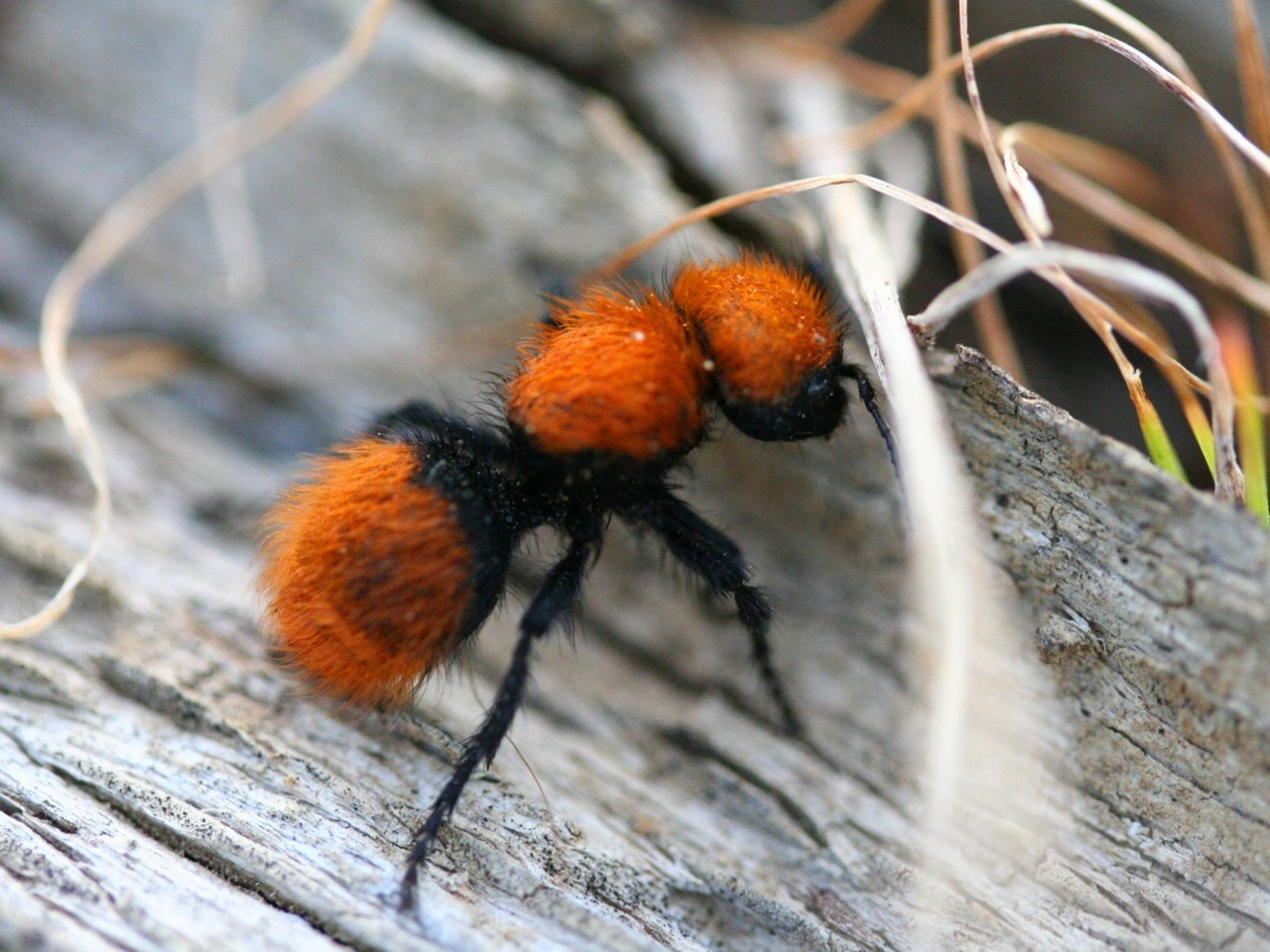
- Dasymutilla aureola

Scientific classification
- Kingdom: Animalia
- Phylum: Arthropoda
- Clade: Pancrustacea
- Class: Insecta
- Order: Hymenoptera
- Family: Mutillidae
- Genus: Dasymutilla
- Species: D. aureola

Binomial name
- Dasymutilla aureola (Cresson, 1865)

= Dasymutilla aureola =

Species of wasp

Dasymutilla aureola, also known as the Pacific velvet ant, is a species of wasp in the velvet ant family Mutillidae, found in the western United States. It has a large, square-shaped head and red, yellow, or orange hair.

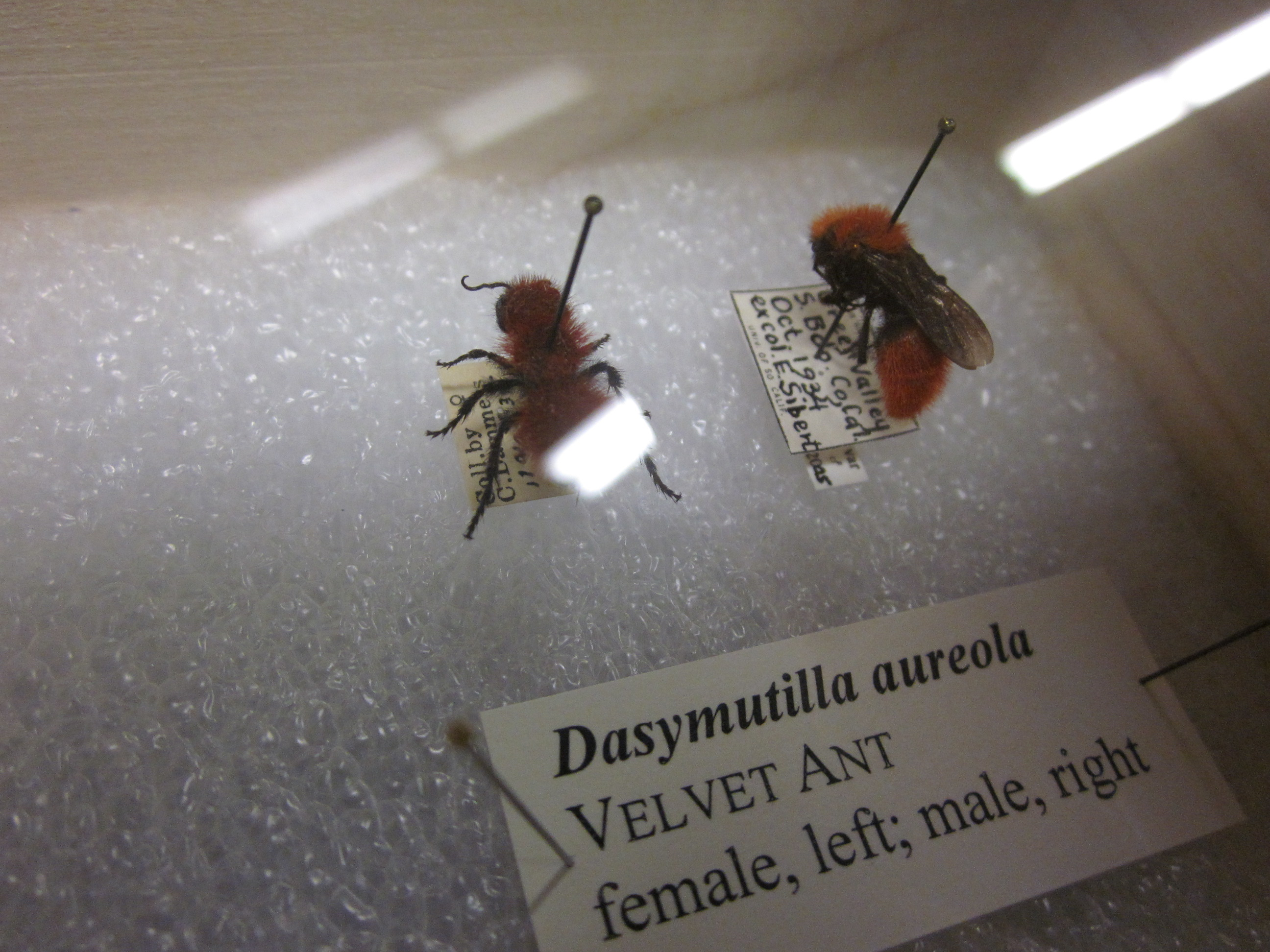
Female (left), without wings, and male (right), with wings.
