= Dasymutilla thetis =

Scientific classification
- Kingdom: Animalia
- Phylum: Arthropoda
- Class: Insecta
- Order: Hymenoptera
- Family: Mutillidae
- Genus: Dasymutilla
- Species: D. thetis

Binomial name
- Dasymutilla thetis Blake, 1886

Synonyms
- Sphaerophthalma thetis Blake, 1886; Dasymutilla candida Mickel, 1928

Species of velvet ant

Dasymutilla thetis, also known as the minute thistledown velvet ant, is a species of velvet ant known only from Arizona in North America. It was first described by Charles A. Blake as Sphaerophthalma thetis in 1886. Individuals are about 7 mm long. Females are "clothed entirely with ivory-white setae."

== Ecology ==
Dasymutilla thetis is part of a Müllerian mimicry complex among pale desert velvet ants, in which multiple unpalatable species share similar coloration to warn predators. The pale (white) coloration of D. thetis may also serve a thermoregulatory function, helping individuals avoid overheating in hot desert habitats. The synonymy—Dasymutilla candida being a junior synonym of D. thetis—was confirmed using both molecular and morphological evidence in a taxonomic revision of southwestern Dasymutilla species. Like other velvet ants, D. thetis has a thick exoskeleton and delivers a painful sting, traits that are part of an effective defensive system against predators.

Recent taxonomic reviews list D. thetis among the diurnal velvet ants found in the southwestern United States, particularly in California, Arizona, and Nevada.
