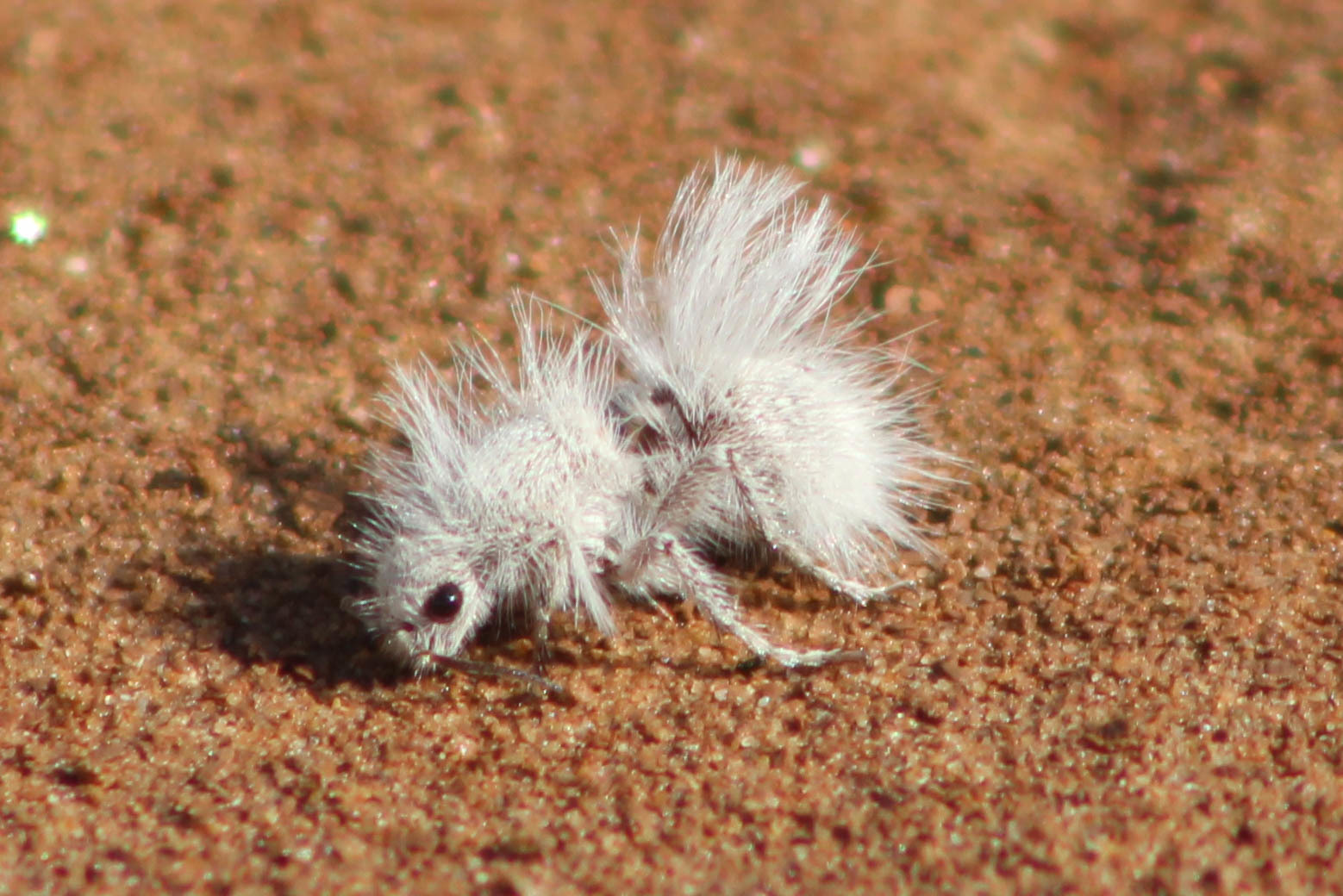
- Female
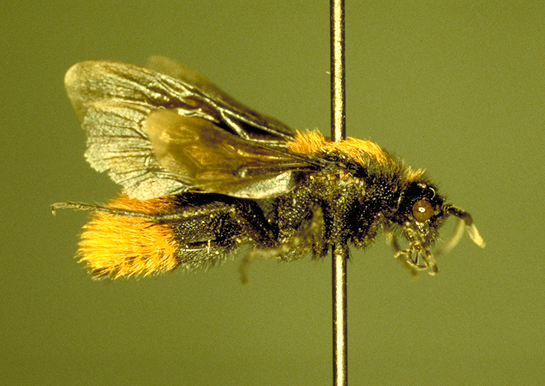
- Male

Scientific classification
- Kingdom: Animalia
- Phylum: Arthropoda
- Class: Insecta
- Order: Hymenoptera
- Family: Mutillidae
- Genus: Dasymutilla
- Species: D. gloriosa

Binomial name
- Dasymutilla gloriosa (Saussure, 1868)

Synonyms
- Mutilla gloriosa Saussure 1868; Mutilla tecta Cresson, 1875; Dasymutilla reperticia Mickel, 1928

= Dasymutilla gloriosa =

Species of wasp

Dasymutilla gloriosa, sometimes referred to as the thistledown velvet ant, is a member of the genus Dasymutilla. Only females are wingless, as in other mutillids. Compared to other mutillids, it is mid-sized, being larger than some of the smallest known species like Dasymutilla vesta but smaller than some of the largest known species like Dasymutilla klugii. It ranges from Utah, Nevada, California, Arizona, New Mexico, Texas and south into Mexico.

Rather than having aposematic coloration like other mutillids, the females of this species are camouflaged by their resemblance to the fruit of Creosotebush, which occurs in the same habitats. However, this species' coloration appears to be primarily an adaptation to hot desert conditions instead of predation pressure; their internal and external body temperature are less compared to orange Dasymutilla species in the same habitat.

Like other mutillids, the females of this species can administer a very painful sting as a defense mechanism. Being a mid-sized mutillid, the sting delivered is more powerful than most smaller mutillids', but weaker than most larger mutillids'.
