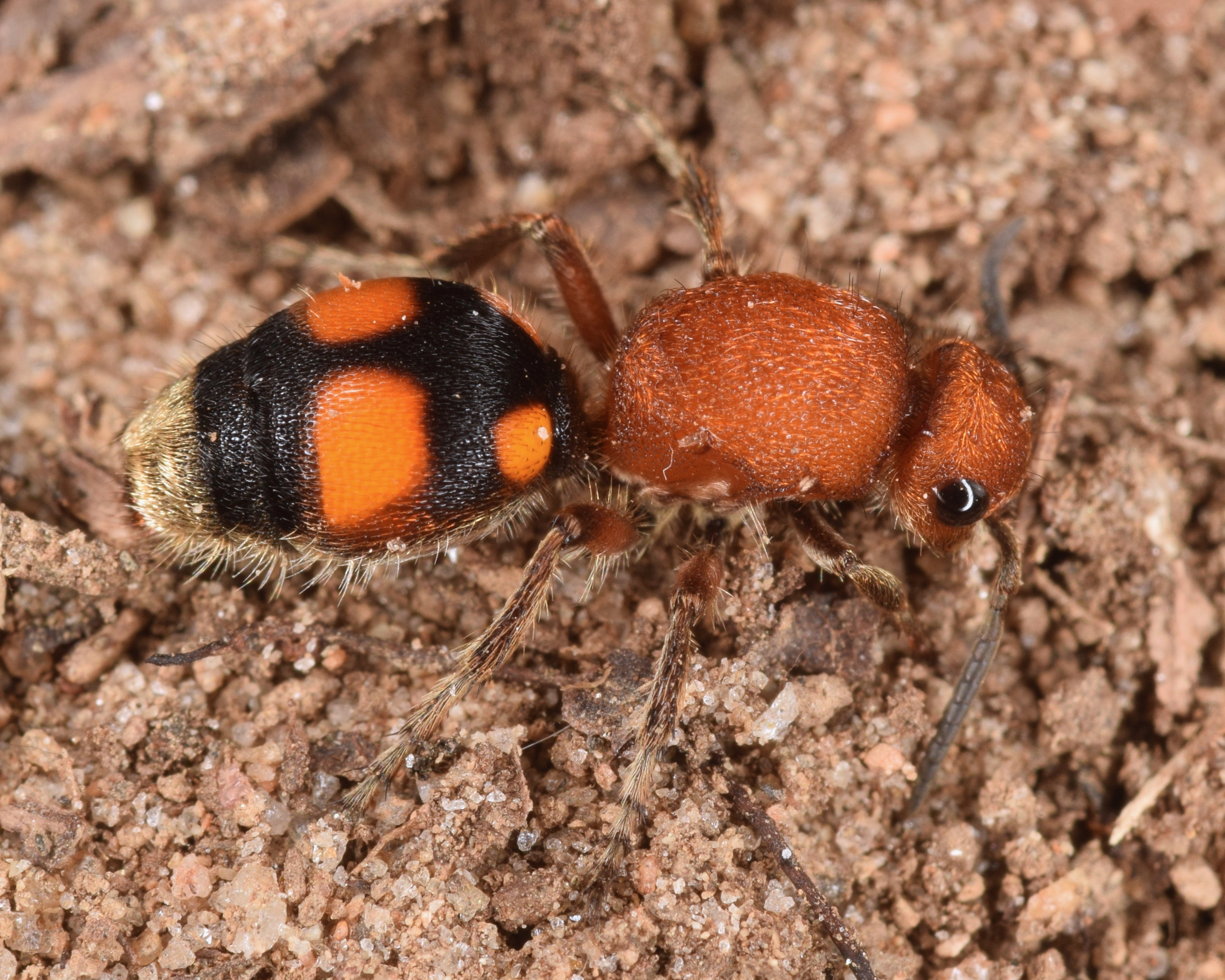

Scientific classification
- Kingdom: Animalia
- Phylum: Arthropoda
- Class: Insecta
- Order: Hymenoptera
- Family: Mutillidae
- Genus: Dasymutilla
- Species: D. quadriguttata

Binomial name
- Dasymutilla quadriguttata (Say, 1823)

= Dasymutilla quadriguttata =

Species of wasp

Dasymutilla quadriguttata is a species of wasp in the family Mutillidae.
