= Dasymutilla sackenii =

- Female specimen

Scientific classification
- Kingdom: Animalia
- Phylum: Arthropoda
- Clade: Pancrustacea
- Class: Insecta
- Order: Hymenoptera
- Family: Mutillidae
- Genus: Dasymutilla
- Species: D. sackenii

Binomial name
- Dasymutilla sackenii Cresson, 1865

Species of wasp

Dasymutilla sackenii, also known as Sacken's velvet ant, is a species of velvet ant, actually a type of wasp. It is found in Oregon, California, Nevada, Baja California, and Baja California Sur. As with most velvet ants, the males have wings and the females are wingless. The females of this species have cream-colored fuzz (setae) on their backs and black fuzz on their ventral side and legs. D. sackenii is most commonly observed May through October; observations December through February are very rare.

Dasymutilla sackenii superficially resembles Dasymutilla albiceris and they also have a similar geographic distribution.

The specific name honors 19th-century German diplomat and entomologist Carl Robert Osten-Sacken.
