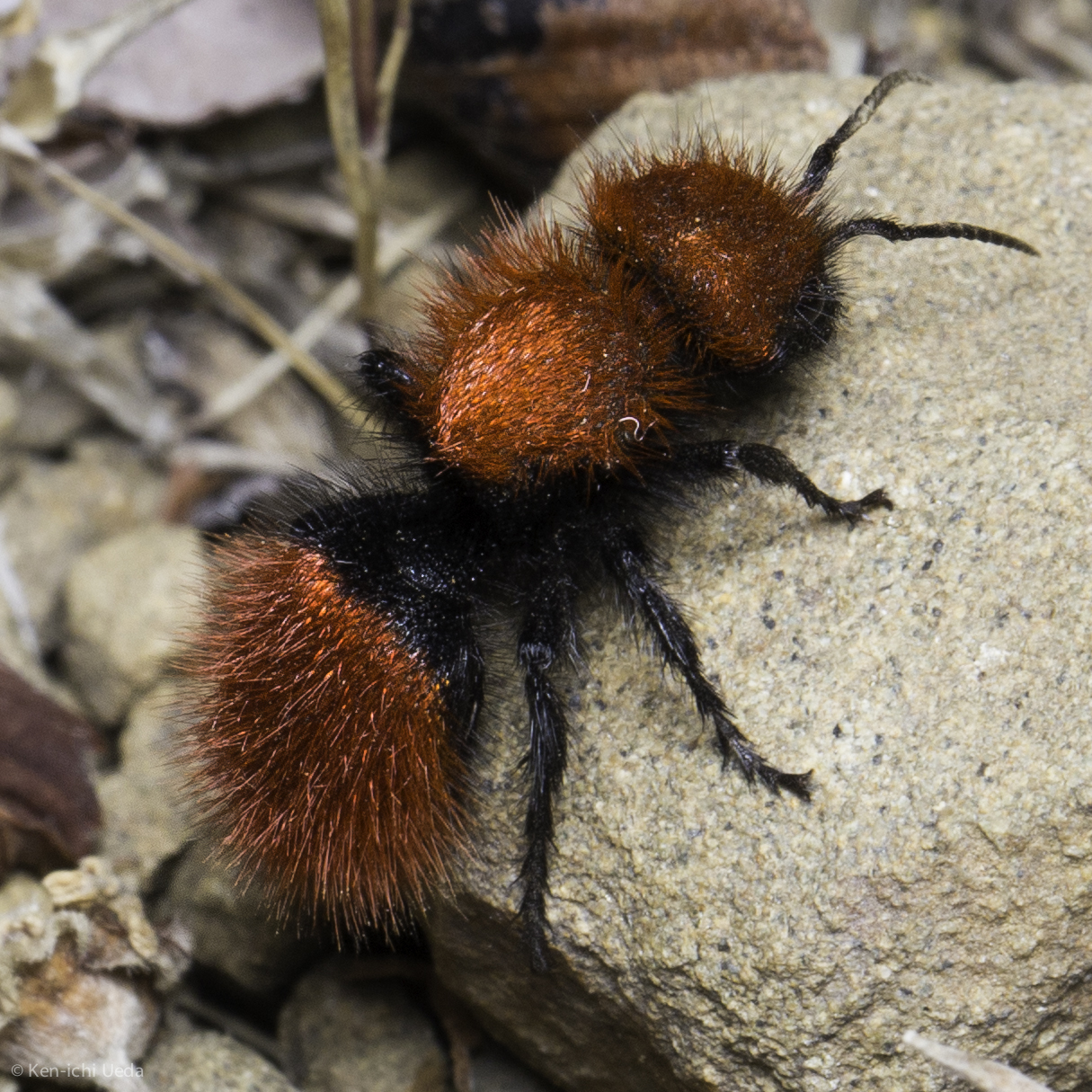
- Dasymutilla aureola
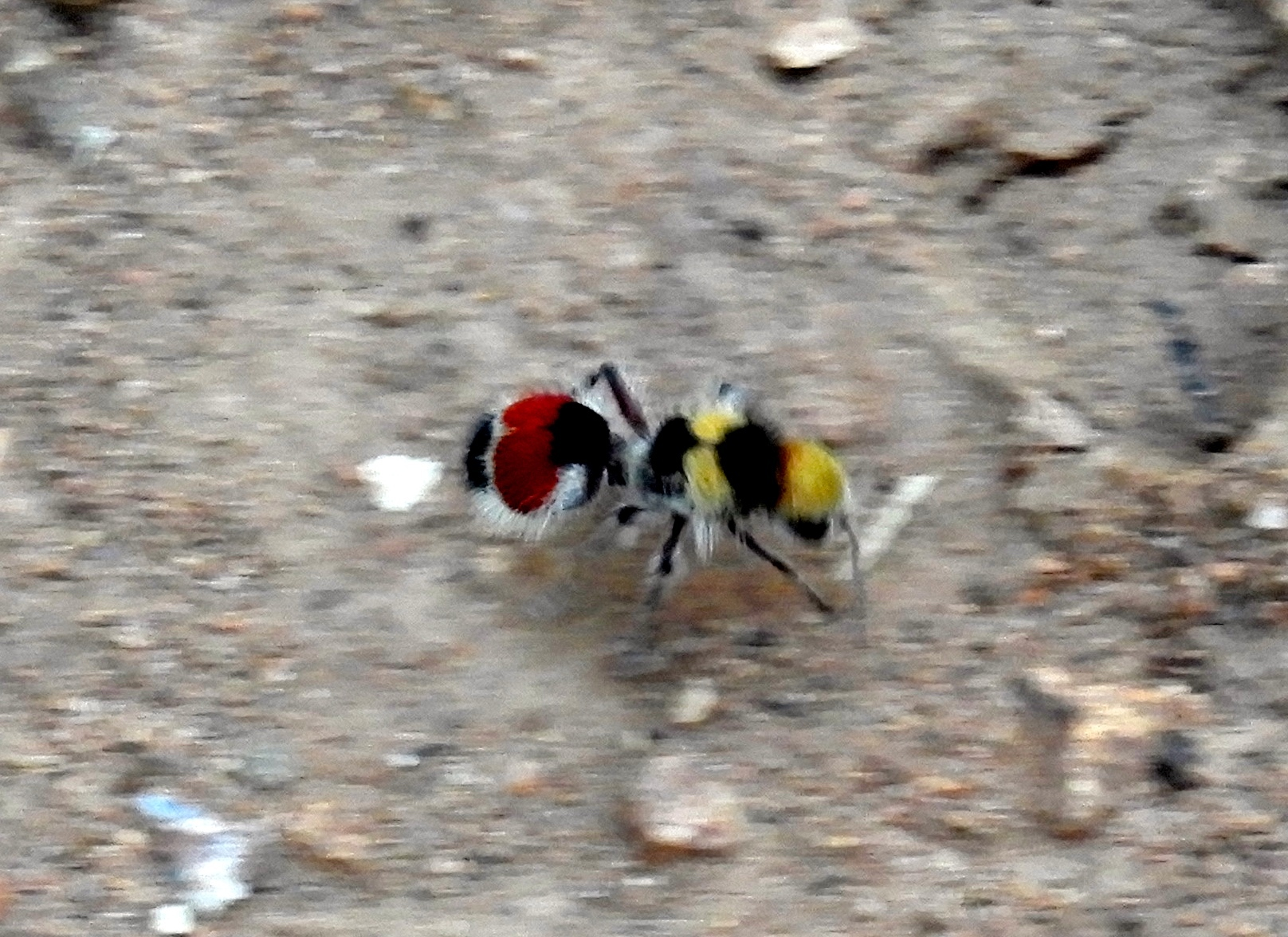
- Dasymutilla foxi

Scientific classification
- Kingdom: Animalia
- Phylum: Arthropoda
- Clade: Pancrustacea
- Class: Insecta
- Order: Hymenoptera
- Family: Mutillidae
- Tribe: Dasymutillini
- Genus: Dasymutilla; Ashmead, 1899

Species
- ~200 species; see text

= Dasymutilla =

Genus of wasps

Dasymutilla is a wasp genus belonging to the family Mutillidae. Their larvae are external parasites to various types of ground-nesting Hymenoptera. Most of the velvet ants in North America—the wingless females of which are conspicuous as colorful, fast, and "fuzzy" bugs—are in the genus Dasymutilla.

== Selected species ==
- D. albiceris
- D. alesia
- D. arachnoides
- D. archboldi
- D. arenivaga
- D. asopus
- D. aureola
- D. bioculata
- D. californica
- D. calorata
- D. chattahoochei
- D. chiron
- D. chisos
- D. coccineohirta
- D. creon
- D. creusa
- D. dilucida
- D. eminentia
- D. fasciventroides
- D. flammifera
- D. foxi
- D. gibbosa
- D. gloriosa (thistledown velvet ant)
- D. gorgon
- D. heliophila
- D. klugii
- D. leda
- D. lepeletierii
- D. magnifica
- D. meracula
- D. monticola
- D. montivagoides
- D. mutata
- D. munifica
- D. nigricauda
- D. nigripes
- D. nitidula
- D. nocturna
- D. nogalensis
- D. occidentalis (cow killer)
- D. pseudopappus
- D. pyrrhus
- D. quadriguttata
- D. sackenii
- D. santanas
- D. scaevola
- D. scitula
- D. sicheliana
- D. stevensi
- D. thetis
- D. vesta
- D. vestita

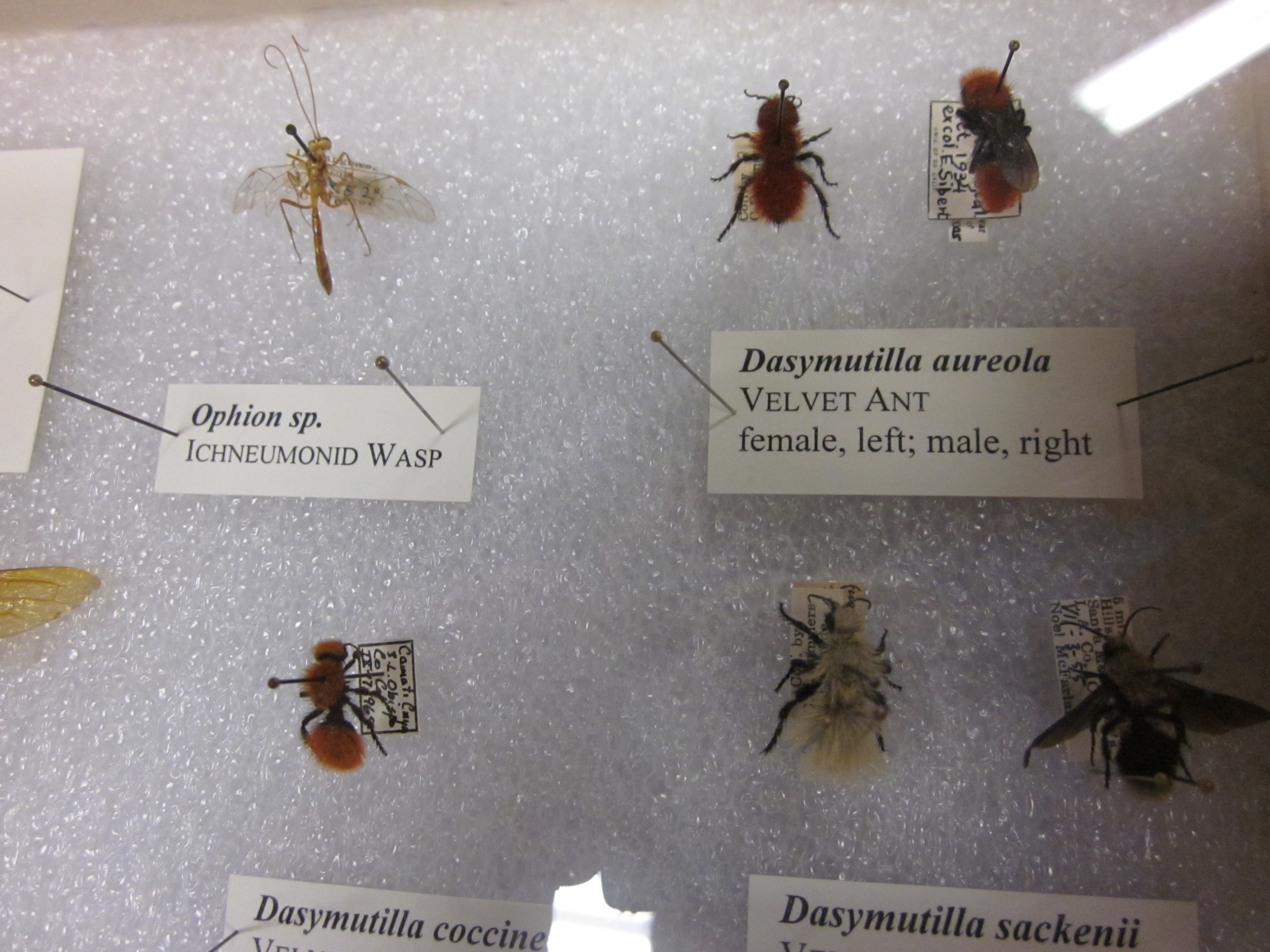
Dasymutilla specimens

== Defenses ==
Certain members of this genus are known for their painful and venomous sting. Members of this genus are highly variable in sting intensity, ranging from a 1 (D. thetis) to a 3 (D. klugii) in the Schmidt sting pain index. On the Starr sting pain scale, at least one velvet ant species (Dasymutilla klugii) outscored 58 species of wasps and bees in the painfulness of its sting, falling short of only the bullet ant (Paraponera clavata), the warrior wasp (Synoeca septentrionalis), and the tarantula hawk (genus Pepsis).

Many species within this genus exhibit Müllerian mimicry. There is an eastern mimicry ring, which includes D. occidentalis and D. vesta, and there is the western mimicry ring, which includes many other species. The effect is to warn off predators by shared aposematic coloration without requiring inexperienced predators to taste and be stung by members of each species separately.

Aside from their aposematic coloration, they can produce a loud squeaking noise which also warns potential predators. Their exoskeleton is remarkably strong; experiments concluded that 11 times more force was needed to crush the exoskeleton of a female velvet ant than that of a honey bee.
