= Clarence E. Mickel =

American entomologist (1892–1982)

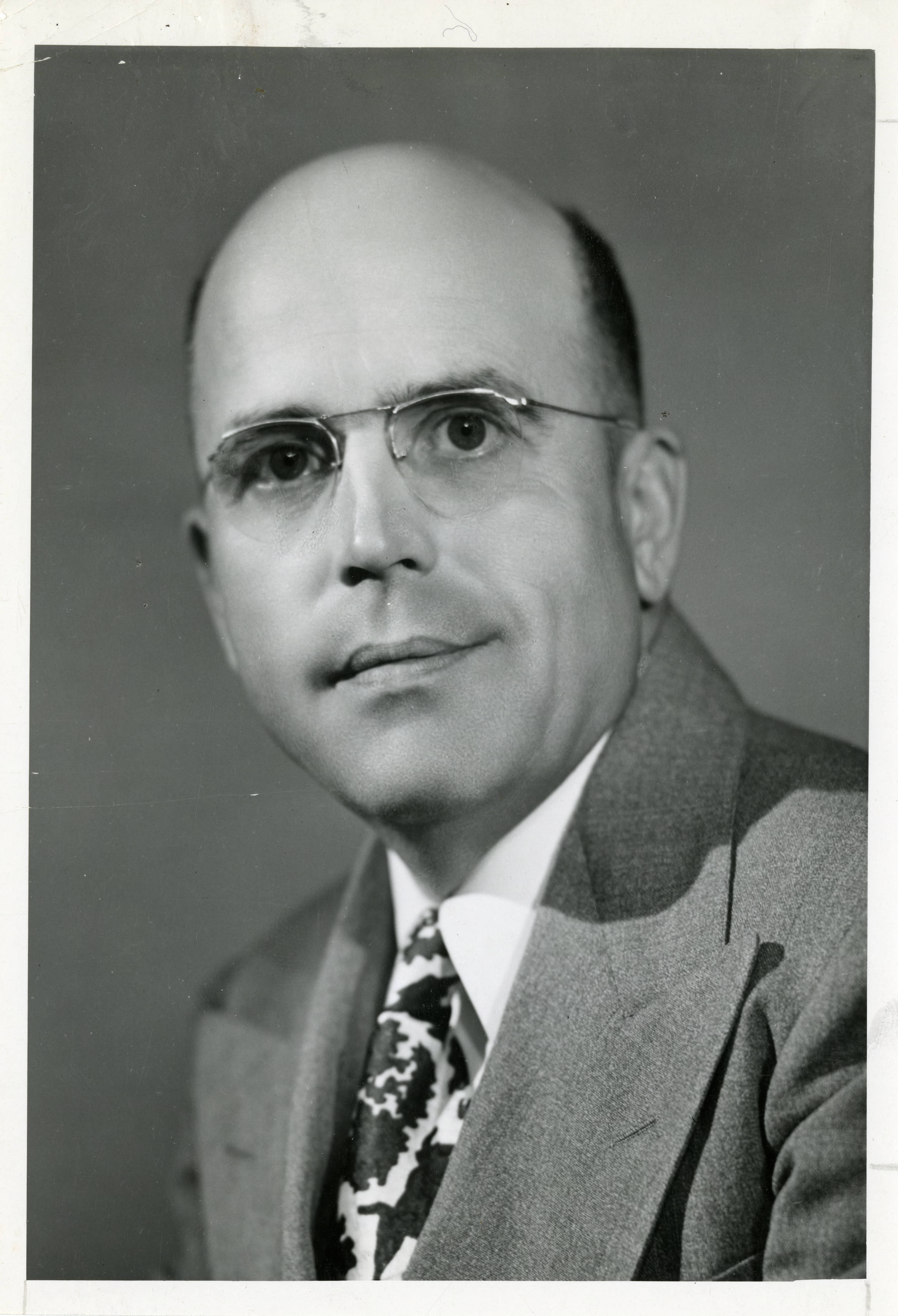
- Clarence E. Mickel, 1944
- Born: Clarence Eugene Mickel; February 29, 1892; Lincoln, Nebraska, United States
- Died: August 29, 1982 (aged 90); Tucson, Arizona, United States
- Occupation(s): Entomologist, economic zoologist, professor, curator

Clarence E. Mickel (February 29, 1892 – August 29, 1982) was an American entomologist, known for his expertise in Mutillidae, among other insect families.

== Biography ==
Mickel was born in Lincoln, Nebraska, United States. In 1917 he worked as an assistant to the Nebraska state entomologist. Mickel worked at the University of Nebraska before joining the University of Minnesota in 1922. He was awarded a Guggenheim fellowship in 1930, so that he could visit Europe and continue his work studying parasites of wasps. As of 1937 he was curator of the University of Minnesota's 900,000-specimen entomology collection. He was considered a "world authority" on velvet ants. His work included two well-regarded monographs on the genus Dasymutilla.

Mickel was an officer of the Entomological Society of America every year between 1936 and 1945. By 1952 he had written almost 50 papers and "supervised the publication of 10 University of Minnesota technical bulletins." Mickel headed the entomology and economic zoology department at Minnesota from 1944 until his retirement in 1960, at which time the university's insect collection had expanded to include approximately 2.5 million specimens. He was a visiting professor at the University of Seoul in 1957. Mickel died in Pima County, Arizona in 1982.

== See also ==
- Category:Taxa named by Clarence E. Mickel
- Species:Category:Clarence Eugene Mickel taxa
