= Coyote Peterson =

American YouTuber (born 1981)

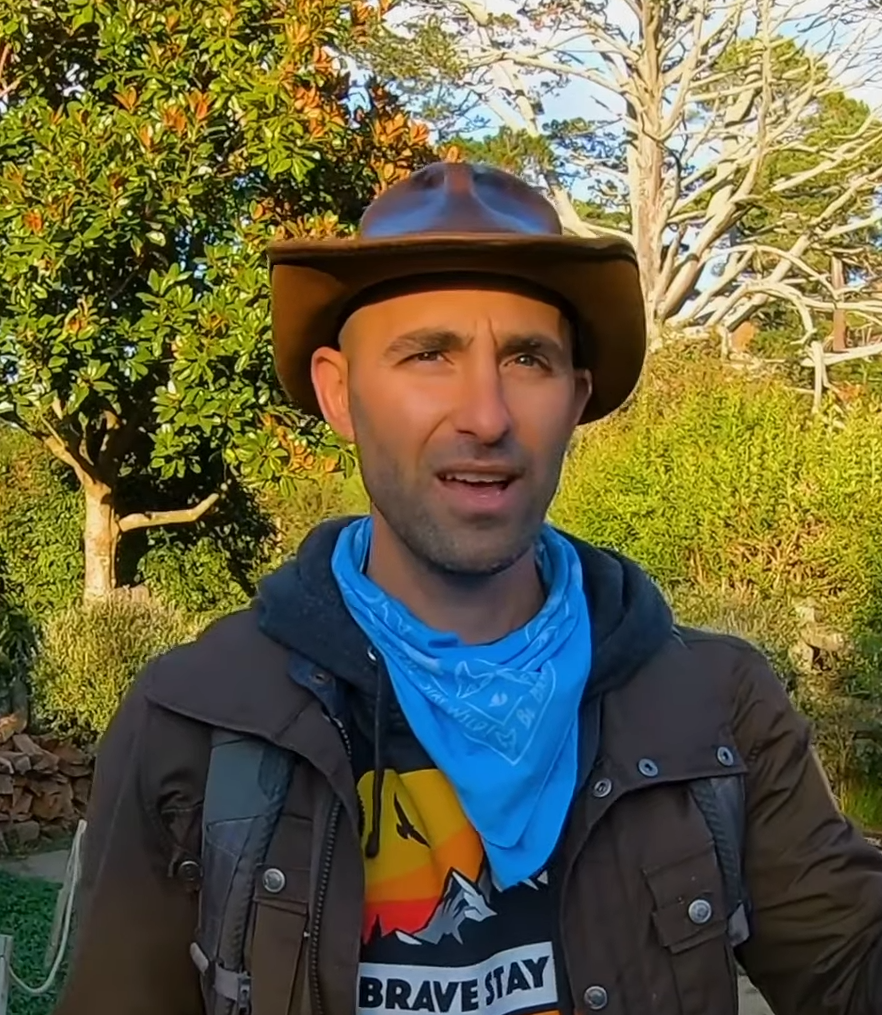
- Peterson in 2020
- Born: Nathaniel Peterson; September 1, 1981 (age 45); Newbury Center, Ohio, U.S.
- Education: Ohio State University (BA)
- Occupations: YouTube personality, wildlife educator, producer, author
- Years active: 2014–present

YouTube information
- Channels: Brave Wilderness; Coyote Peterson
- Subscribers: 1.19 million (main channel); 22.99 million (combined) (Note: Subscribers, broken down by channel: 21.8 million (Brave Wilderness) 1.19 million (Coyote Peterson))
- Views: 210.8 million (main channel); 5.5 billion (combined) (Note: Views, broken down by channel: 5.29 billion (Brave Wilderness) 210.81 million (Coyote Peterson))
- Last updated: June 25, 2026
- Website: bravewilderness.com

Nathaniel "Coyote" Peterson (born September 1, 1981) is an American YouTuber, wildlife educator, and host of Animal Planet's series Coyote Peterson: Brave the Wild. He is best known for his YouTube channel Brave Wilderness, which focuses on documenting and educating about animals. Peterson has also become known for videos in which he allows himself to be stung or bitten by various animals, many of them venomous, such as the bullet ant and the executioner wasp.

He hosts several other series on YouTube and other platforms including Breaking Trail, Beyond the Tide, Dragon Tails, Base Camp, Brave Wilderness, On Location and Coyote's Backyard. These series span many tropical and temperate locations, including much of the United States, Australia, Brazil, New Zealand, South Africa, Japan, the Bahamas, and Costa Rica.

His team includes camera operators Mark Vins and Mario Aldecoa, trained wildlife experts who occasionally present episodes themselves.

== Background ==
Nathaniel Peterson was born on September 1, 1981. He grew up in rural Newbury, Ohio, about 20 miles east of Cleveland. At a very young age, Coyote took an interest in animals, inspired by his mother. He loved exploring the outdoors and catching different animals. He is of German and Hungarian descent. In his youth, he spent a lot of time in and around the Tohono Oʼodham Nation learning from their culture, which he got a tattoo to symbolise in 2024.

As he grew older, he attended Notre Dame-Cathedral Latin High School, a college-prep school. He then studied film at Ohio State University, from which he enrolled in 2000 and then graduated in 2004. Though a self-described animal expert, he is not formally educated in any biological science and does not have any animal training and as such has warned viewers not to imitate his methods of handling. Peterson has a daughter, Olivia, who is often featured in his videos.

== YouTube career ==
Peterson began posting videos on his YouTube channel, Brave Wilderness, in 2014. On the channel, he hosts several series including: Breaking Trail, which won a 2015 Emmy Award for youth/teen programs, Dragon Tails, Coyote's Backyard, Beyond the Tide, and On Location. Peterson made his first "bug attack" video unintentionally in 2016. His most popular videos are ones where he intentionally lets venomous insects sting him, working his way up the "Schmidt sting pain index" created by entomologist Justin Schmidt. Early videos featured harvester ants before moving on to fire ants, the velvet ant, the tarantula hawk, and then the bullet ant, which has the most painful sting on the sting pain index. He was later stung by a warrior wasp, an Asian giant hornet, and the executioner wasp. In the executioner wasp video, he declares its sting worse than that of the bullet ant, stating "the executioner is king."

He started his dangerous experiments because of the enthusiastic response of his audience. In 2019, Peterson's channel set Guinness World Records for the most-subscribed YouTube channel dedicated to animals and for the most-viewed animal channel. In 2020, Peterson said that he was probably done making "sting and bite" videos. Peterson was featured on Conan, along with Jeff Goldblum, where he brought many animals. In May 2021, Peterson and his teammate Mark Vins participated in a video call with president Joe Biden and Anthony Fauci to promote COVID-19 vaccinations.

On July 7, 2022, Peterson released a Facebook post in which he claimed to have excavated a large primate skull in British Columbia and smuggled it into the United States, further claiming to have initially hidden the discovery due to concerns of government intervention. The post went viral, garnering the attention of multiple scientists who dismissed the finding as a likely replica gorilla skull. Darren Naish, a vertebrate paleontologist, stated, "I'm told that Coyote Peterson does this sort of thing fairly often as clickbait, and that this is a stunt done to promote an upcoming video. Maybe this is meant to be taken as harmless fun. But in an age where anti-scientific feelings and conspiracy culture are a serious problem it - again - really isn't a good look. I think this stunt has backfired". In the follow-up video posted by Peterson, it was revealed that the situation was staged as a hypothetical example of what not to do in response to such a discovery.

In 2022, his YouTube show Coyote Peterson's Wild Field Trip was nominated for Outstanding Host at the Children's and Family Emmy Awards.

== Animal Planet series ==
On November 16, 2018, it was announced that the Brave Wilderness crew would be creating a TV program on Animal Planet titled Coyote Peterson: Brave the Wild. A contract-signing episode was posted on their YouTube channel. The television special Coyote Peterson: Return to the Wilderness debuted on February 3, 2019. The series Coyote Peterson: Brave the Wild premiered on Animal Planet on February 9, 2020.

== Books ==
- Coyote Peterson’s Brave Adventures: Wild Animals in a Wild World! (2017) Mango ISBN 1-6335-3577-0
- Coyote Peterson: The King of Sting! (2018) Little, Brown Books for Young Readers ISBN 0-3164-5238-6
- Coyote Peterson's Brave Adventures: Epic Encounters in the Animal Kingdom (2019) Little, Brown Books for Young Readers ISBN 0-3164-5240-8
- Coyote Peterson's Wildlife Adventure: An Interactive Guide With Facts, Photos, and More! (2019) Little, Brown Books for Young Readers ISBN 0-3164-5804-X
- Coyote Peterson: The Beast of Bites (2020) Little, Brown Books for Young Readers ISBN 0-3164-6110-5
