= Stinger =

Sharp organ capable of injecting venom

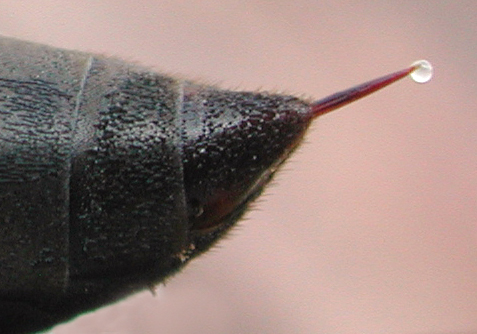
Wasp stinger, with droplet of venom

A stinger (or sting) is a sharp organ found in various animals (typically insects and other arthropods) capable of injecting venom, usually by piercing the epidermis of another animal.

An insect sting is complicated by its introduction of venom, although not all stings are venomous. Bites, which can introduce saliva as well as additional pathogens and diseases, are often confused with stings, and vice versa. Specific components of venom are believed to give rise to an allergic reaction, which in turn produces skin lesions that may vary from a small itching weal, or slightly elevated area of the skin, to large areas of inflamed skin covered by vesicles and crusted lesions.

Stinging insects produce a painful swelling of the skin, the severity of the lesion varying according to the location of the sting, the identity of the insect and the sensitivity of the subject. Many species of bees and wasps have two poison glands, one gland secreting a toxin in which formic acid is one recognized constituent, and the other secreting an alkaline neurotoxin; acting independently, each toxin is rather mild, but when they combine through the sting, the combination has strong irritating properties. In a small number of cases, the second occasion of a bee or wasp sting causes a severe allergic reaction known as anaphylaxis.

While the overwhelming majority of insects withdraw their stingers from their victims, a few insects leave them in the wounds. For example, of the 20,000 species of bees worldwide, only the half-dozen species of honeybees (Apis) are reported to have a barbed stinger that cannot be withdrawn; of wasps, nearly all are reported to have smooth stingers with the exception of two species, Polybia rejecta and Synoeca surinama. A few non-insect arthropods, such as scorpions, also sting.

== Arthropods ==
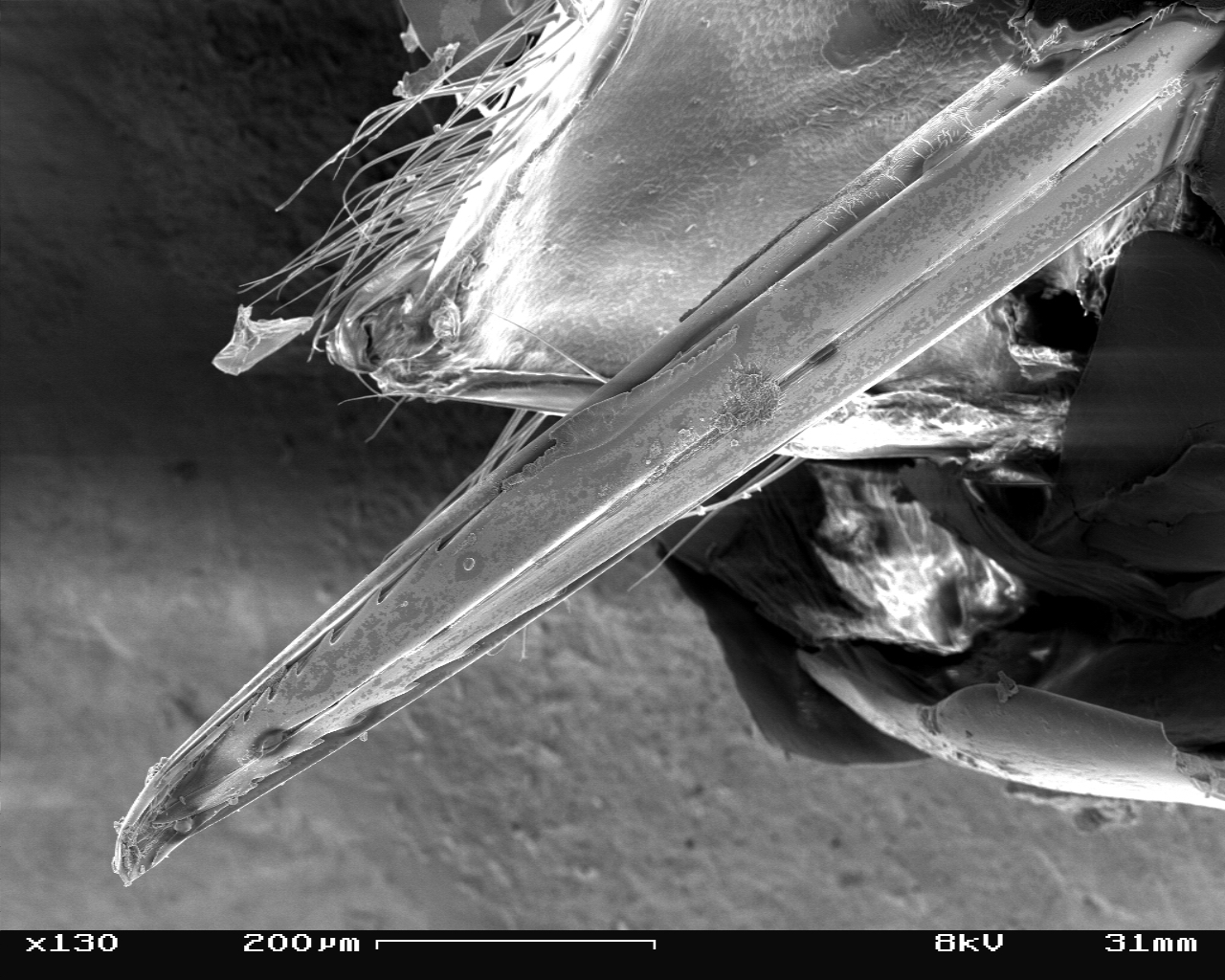
Yellowjacket wasp sting in its sheath, seen in a scanning electron microscope

Among arthropods, a sting or stinger is a sharp organ, often connected with a venom gland and adapted to inflict a wound by piercing, as with the caudal sting of a scorpion. Stings are usually located at the rear of the animal. Animals with stings include bees, wasps (including hornets), some ants like fire ants, and scorpions, as well as a single beetle species (Onychocerus albitarsis) that can deliver a venomous sting from its antennae, whose terminal segments have evolved to resemble a scorpion's tail.

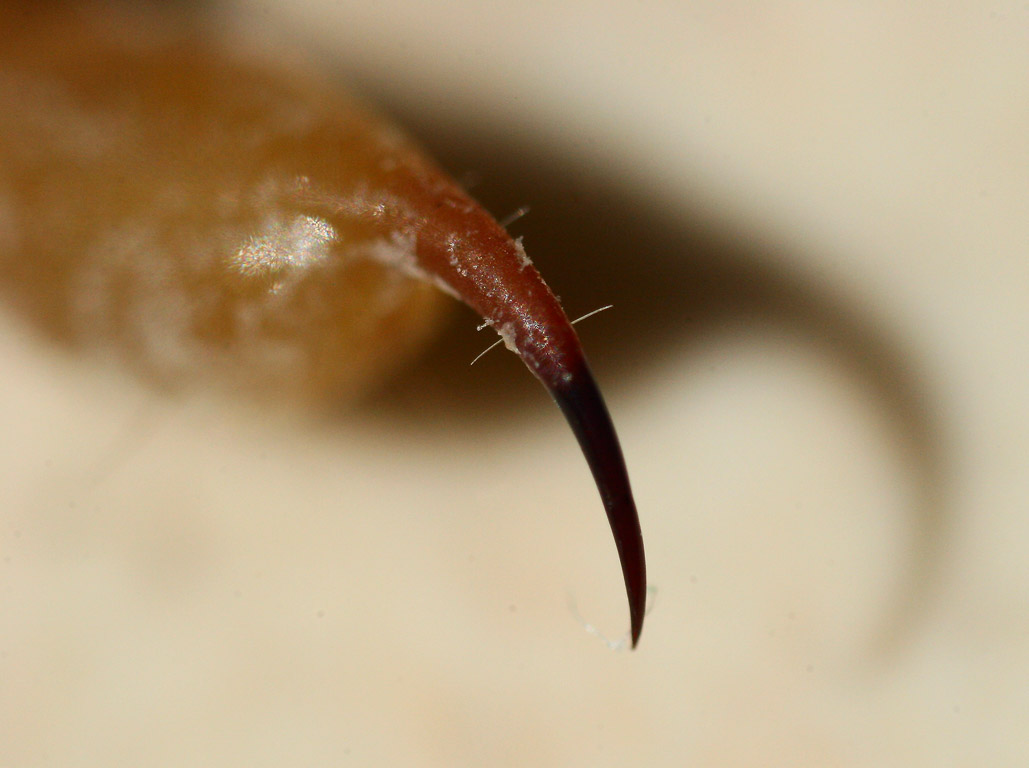
Scorpion stinger

In all stinging Hymenoptera the sting is a modified ovipositor. Unlike most other stings, honey bee workers' stings are strongly barbed and lodge in the flesh of mammals upon use, tearing free from the honey bee's body, killing the bee within minutes. The sting has its own ganglion, and it continues to saw into the target's flesh and release venom for several minutes. This trait is of obvious disadvantage to the individual but protects the hive from attacks by large animals; aside from the effects of the venom, the remnant also marks the stung animal with honey bee alarm pheromone. The barbs of a honey bee's attack are only suicidal if the skin is elastic, as is characteristic of vertebrates such as birds and mammals; honey bees can sting other insects repeatedly without dying.

The sting of nearly all other bees and other sting-bearing organisms is not barbed and can be used to sting repeatedly. The description of barbed or unbarbed is not precise: there are barbs on the stings of yellowjacket wasps and the Mexican honey wasp, but the barbs are so small that the wasp can sometimes withdraw its sting apparatus from victim's skin.

The stings of some wasps, such as those of the Polistes versicolor, contain relatively large amounts of 5-hydroxytryptamine (5-HT) in its venoms. The 5-HT in these venoms has been found to play at least two roles: one as a pain-producing agent and the other in the distribution and penetration of the paralyzing components to vulnerable sites in the offender. This helps in the rapid immobilization of the animal or of the body parts receiving the venom.

Spiders only bite, although some tarantulas have barbed bristles called urticating hairs. Certain caterpillars also have urticating hairs. Centipedes also possess a venomous bite rather than a sting, inflicted with a highly modified first pair of legs, called forcipules.

== Stingrays, platypuses and jellyfish ==
Organs that perform similar functions in non-arthropods are often referred to as "stings". These organs include the modified dermal denticle of the stingray, the venomous spurs on the hind legs of the male platypus, and the cnidocyte tentacles of the jellyfish.

== See also ==
- Bee sting
- Cnidocyte
- Chelicerae
- Forcipule
- Insect bite
- Schmidt Sting Pain Index
- Starr sting pain scale
- Stinging plant
