= Synoeca ilheensis =

Scientific classification
- Domain: Eukaryota
- Kingdom: Animalia
- Phylum: Arthropoda
- Class: Insecta
- Order: Hymenoptera
- Family: Vespidae
- Subfamily: Polistinae
- Genus: Synoeca
- Species: S. ilheensis

Binomial name
- Synoeca ilheensis Lopes & Menezes, 2017

Species of wasp

Synoeca ilheensis is a species of wasp in the genus Synoeca. It is found within the Atlantic Forest lowlands in South America. Members of this species are more aggressive and will warn invaders by producing a rhythm with their wings that resembles soldiers marching. Synoeca ilheensis was publicly announced on August 3, 2017.

Synoeca ilheensis is similar to Synoeca septentrionalis and Synoeca surinama.

== Discovery ==
Rodolpho S.T. Menezes noted that he found specimens of Synoeca septentrionalis in the Atlantic Forest. He also stated they could be a separate species. In 2017, Mendes and Rogério Botion Lopes studied the specimens and determined them to be a separate species. The main defining traits are the coloration, jaw, and abdomen.
