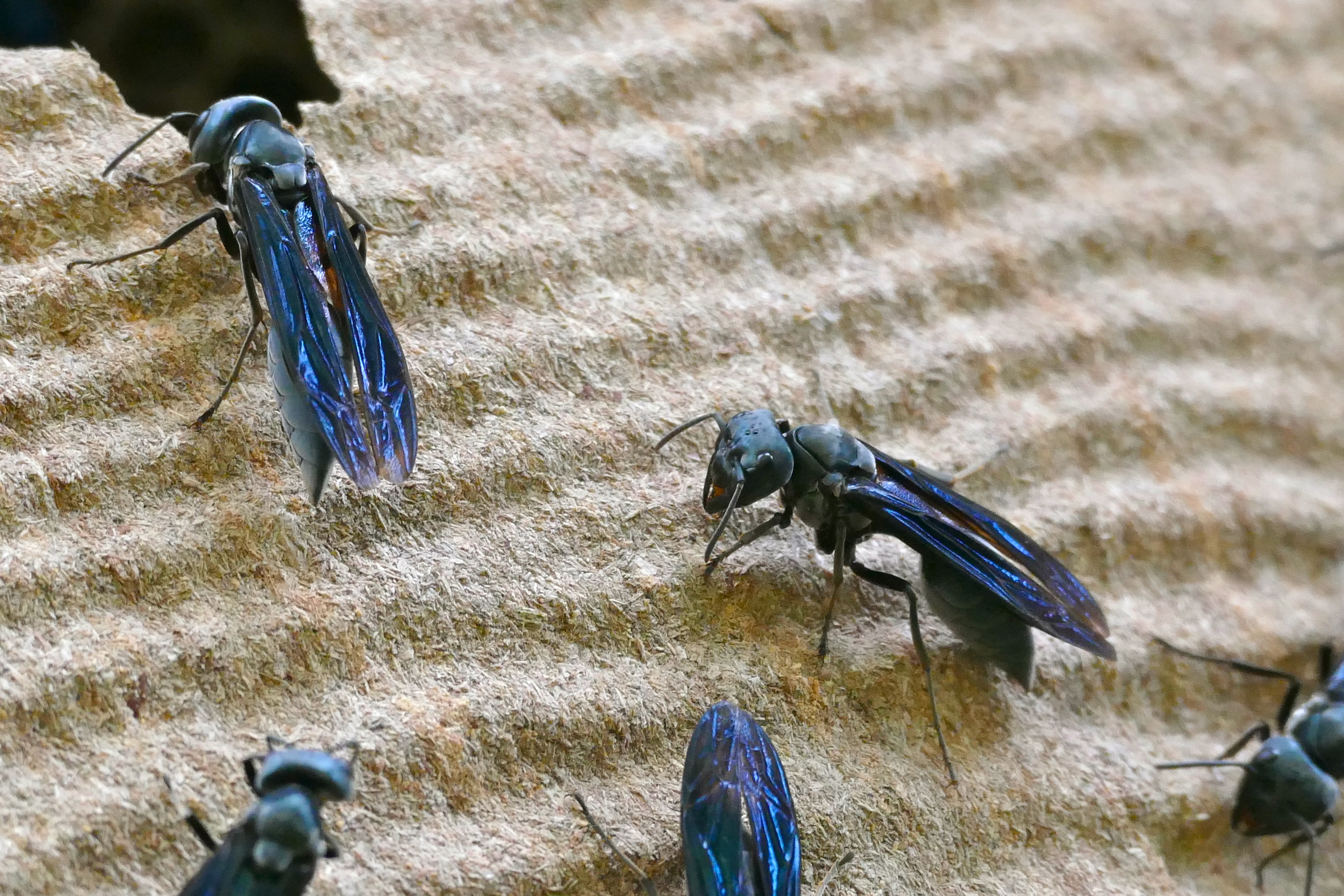
- Synoeca cyanea on their nest
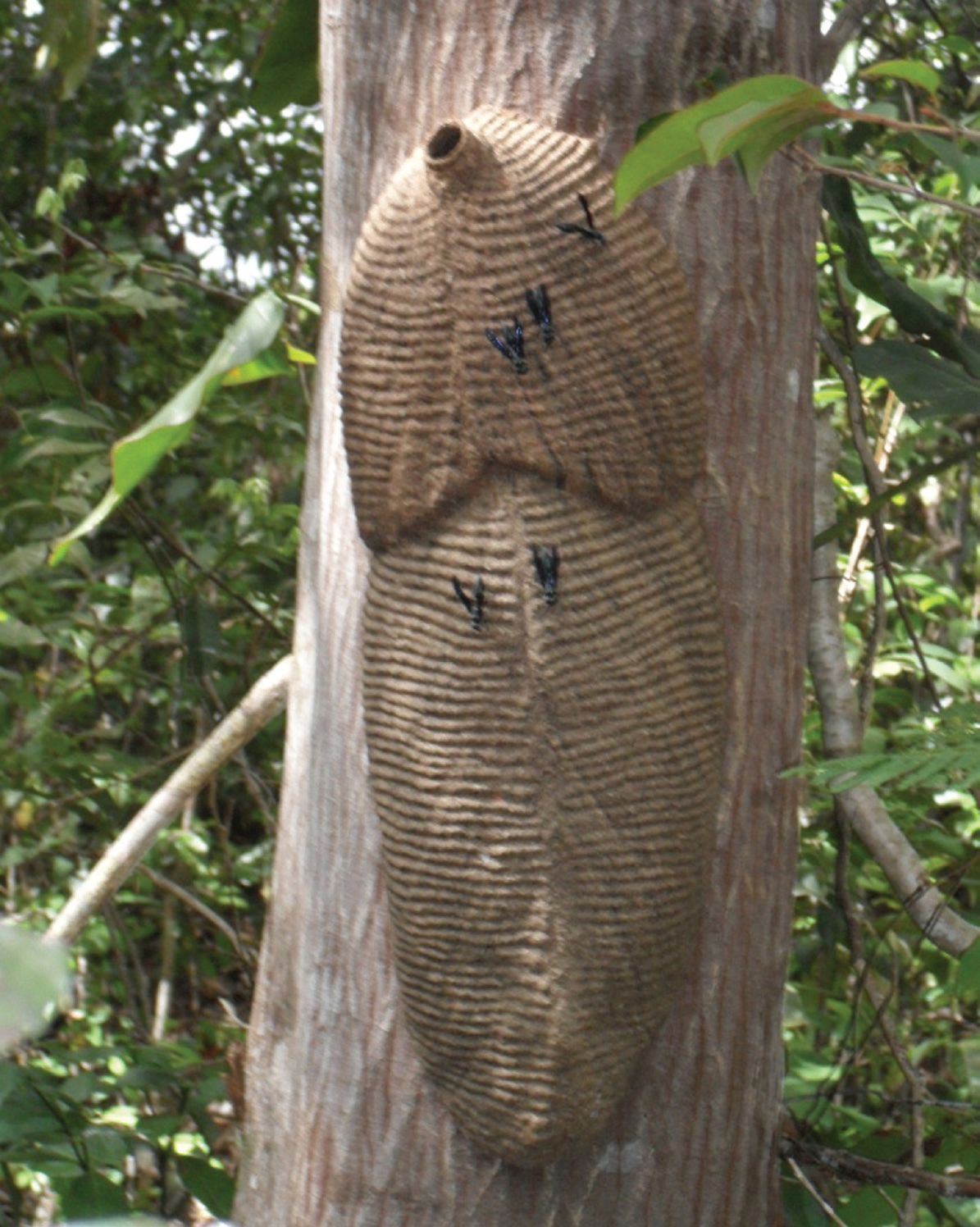
- S. septentrionalis nest

Scientific classification
- Kingdom: Animalia
- Phylum: Arthropoda
- Class: Insecta
- Order: Hymenoptera
- Family: Vespidae
- Subfamily: Polistinae
- Tribe: Epiponini
- Genus: Synoeca de Saussure, 1852

Type species
- Vespa surinama Linnaeus 1767

Species
- 6 described species

= Synoeca =

Genus of wasps

Synoeca is a genus of eusocial paper wasps found in the tropical forests of the Americas. Commonly known as warrior wasps or drumming wasps, they are known for their aggressive behavior, a threat display consisting of multiple insects guarding a nest beating their wings in a synchronized fashion, and an extremely painful sting (rating at the highest level of 4 in the Schmidt sting pain index). The sting is barbed and if used often kills the wasp, which may be the reason why such a striking defensive display is used. This display escalates from drumming inside the nest to hundreds of wasps moving on to the envelope of the nest and continuing to drum. If this does not deter the threat only then do the wasps begin to sting.

== Distribution and habitat ==
The genus has a wide range within the Americas, with specimens being found in the tropical and subtropical portions thereof. S. septentrionalis is generally found in the northern part of the range, having been observed as far north as Mexico, throughout Central America and northern South America. A very similar species, S. ilheensis, extends into Brazil and, until 2017, was reported as a southern population of S. septentrionalis. The other species in the genus are predominantly found in South America, as far south as Argentina.

Synoeca thrives in tropical rainforests, building arboreal nests in trees, typically on the underside of major branches. A single comb is built directly on the tree trunk; and the nests have a characteristic shape which resembles an armadillo, leading to common vernacular names such as marimbondo-tatu or armadillo wasp. These wasps swarm to form new colonies, a single queen leaves the nest accompanied by some workers to a new nest site. The queen uses pheromones to suppress the reproductive behaviour of the workers. When one queen dies she is replaced by another; colonies may last up to 16 years.

== Species ==
- Synoeca cyanea Fabricius, 1775
- Synoeca chalibea de Saussure, 1852 (often misspelled as chalybea)
- Synoeca ilheensis Lopes & Menezes, 2017
- Synoeca septentrionalis Richards 1978
- Synoeca surinama Linnaeus 1767
- Synoeca virginea Fabricius, 1804

== Venom and potential utilisation ==
Entomologist Justin Schmidt has ranked the sting of the species S. septentrionalis as a 4 on his Schmidt sting pain index and has described it as "torture." "You are chained in the flow of an active volcano." This is the highest ranking in his index and also includes the bullet ant and a species of tarantula hawk in the genus Pepsis.

A research team in Brazil has discovered that Synoeca stings contain a newly discovered compound that could be used to treat anxiety, apparently working as effectively as diazepam when tested on rats.
