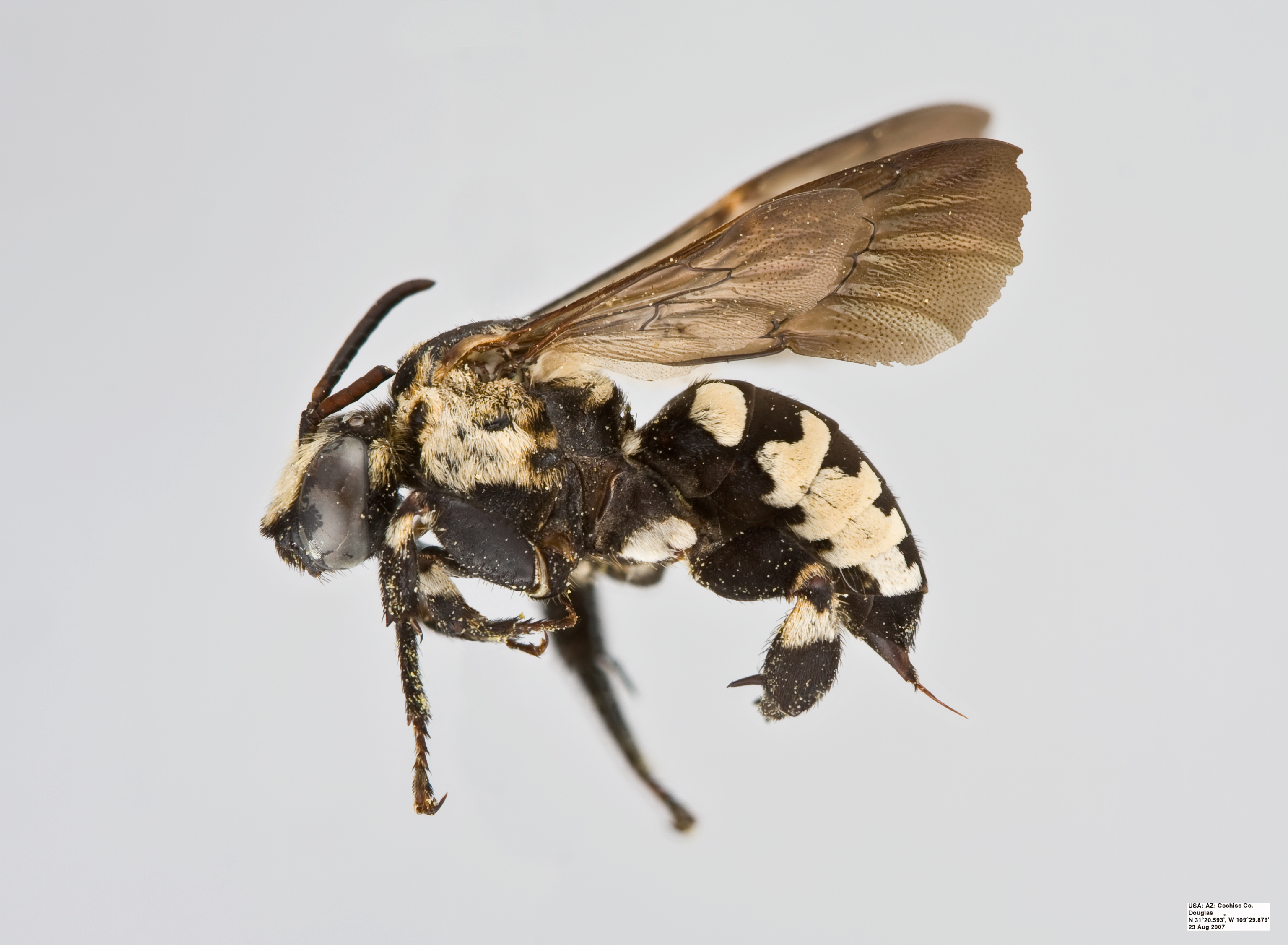

Scientific classification
- Domain: Eukaryota
- Kingdom: Animalia
- Phylum: Arthropoda
- Class: Insecta
- Order: Hymenoptera
- Family: Apidae
- Tribe: Ericrocidini
- Genus: Ericrocis
- Species: E. pintada

Binomial name
- Ericrocis pintada Snelling & Zavortink, 1984

= Ericrocis pintada =

Species of bee

Ericrocis pintada is a species of bee in the family Apidae. It is found in Central America and North America.
