= Nebria christinae =

Scientific classification
- Domain: Eukaryota
- Kingdom: Animalia
- Phylum: Arthropoda
- Class: Insecta
- Order: Coleoptera
- Suborder: Adephaga
- Family: Carabidae
- Genus: Nebria
- Species: N. christinae

Binomial name
- Nebria christinae Huber & Schmidt, 2007

Species of beetle

Nebria christinae is a species of black coloured ground beetle from Nebriinae family that is endemic to Nepal.
