= Schmidt sting pain index =

Pain scale for insect stings

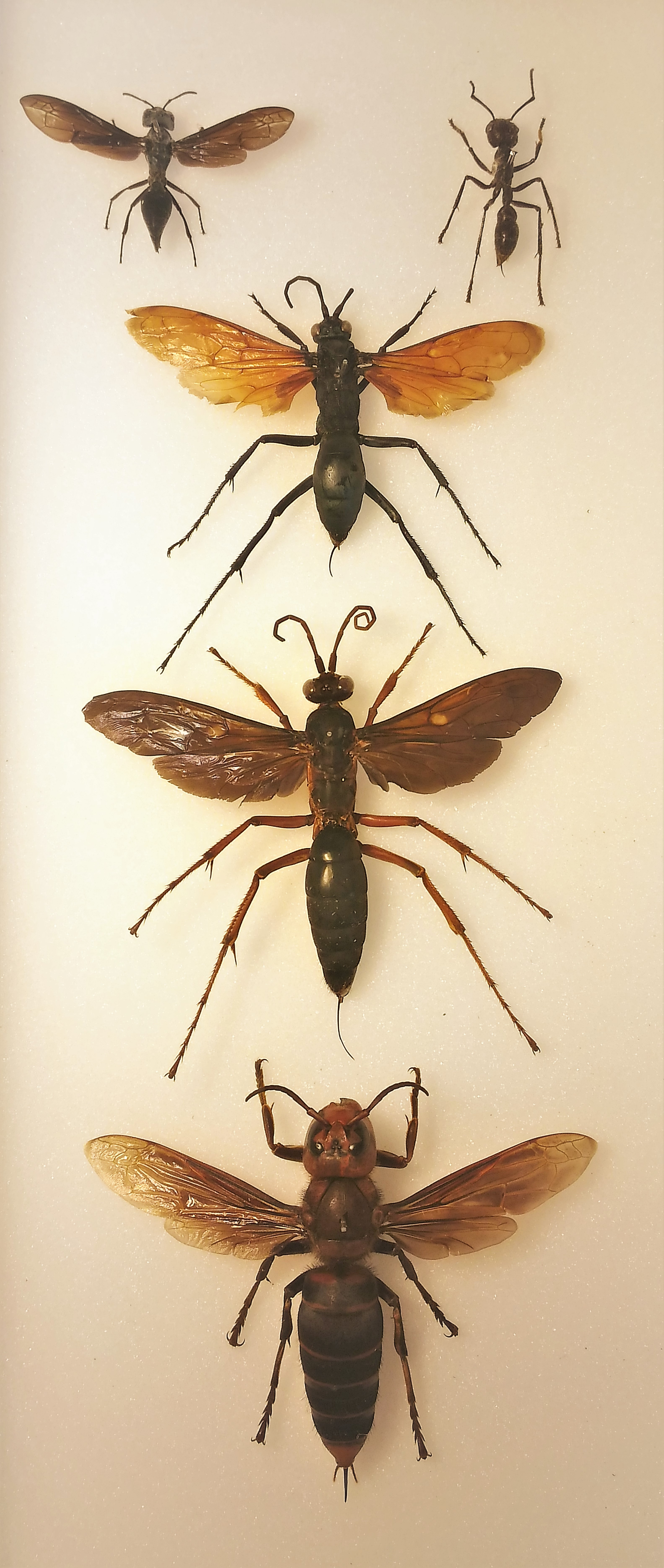
- Some species representing the Schmidt sting pain index: Synoeca surinama, Paraponera clavata, Pepsis sp., Hemipepsis sp., and Vespa mandarinia
- Purpose: Rates the pain of different stings

The Schmidt sting pain index is a pain scale rating the relative pain caused by different hymenopteran stings. It is mainly the work of Justin O. Schmidt, who was an entomologist at the Carl Hayden Bee Research Center in Arizona.

Schmidt's original 1983 paper was a way to systematize and compare the hemolytic properties of insect venoms. A table in the paper included a column that rated sting pain, starting from 0 for stings that are completely ineffective against humans, progressing through 2 for familiar pains such as those caused by common bee or wasp stings, and finishing at 4 for the most painful stings. Only the bullet ant, Paraponera clavata, was given a rating of 4, although later versions of the index added two more species.

Schmidt repeatedly refined his scale, including a paper published in 1990, which classifies the stings of 78 species and 41 genera of Hymenoptera, and culminating in a book published in 2016.

== Motivation ==
The Schmidt sting pain index arose from the pursuit of a larger hypothesis: that the evolution of sociality in Hymenoptera was dependent on the evolution of venom that was both painful and toxic. Pain is a signal of damage in the body, but molecules that produce pain are not the same as toxic molecules, which actually cause damage. Although the painful signal acts as a deterrent, intelligent predators learn the dishonesty of this signal with repeated exposure. For the early Hymenoptera that were primarily solitary, the pain alone would allow them the chance to escape. Moreover, solitary insects do not provide a high energy reward for predators, and therefore predators do not expend significant effort to hunt them.

However, colonies of Hymenoptera are a nutritionally rich target. If there were no defenses, predators would devour the defenseless society, leaving few surviving individuals. Therefore it was theorized that the development of toxicity in Hymenoptera facilitated the development of sociality, which brings various benefits, including the shared raising of young, individual task specialization, inter-colony communication, and food storage. Assays for toxicity were already well characterized, so the evolutionary connection between toxicity and sociality could be studied. Schmidt developed his pain index to relate the amount of sociality to the level of pain.

== Development ==
Schmidt developed the index from observations made during his research on Hymenoptera and their venoms. He recorded the pain produced by around a thousand stings from more than 80 groups of ants, bees, and wasps, using his own experiences as the main comparison basis. He used the sting of the western honey bee (Apis Mellifera), a familiar and moderately painful sting, as a reference point with a rating of 2. Other stings were then given relative ratings on a scale from 0, for stings ineffective against humans, to 4, for the most painful stings. Schmidt also obtained ratings from colleagues to compare with his own scores.

These ratings were intended to make sting pain comparable for ecological and evolutionary research instead of giving clinical measures of pain. Schmidt uses the index with toxicity data to see whether greater pain and venom toxicity were associated with the evolution of sociality in Hymenoptera.

== Scale summary ==
Schmidt's pain scale of Hymenopteran stings is organized into levels, ranging between 1 and 4, with 4 being the most painful. However, insect stings that feel very different can be put into the same level. Thus, later versions of the scale always include a brief description of his experience being stung by each type of insect.

Level 1	Some of the insect stings Schmidt considered to be at a pain level of 1 include the Southern fire ant, the graceful twig ant, the Western paper wasp, the urban digger bee, and most small bees. The duration of the pain of insect stings categorized into Pain Level 1 generally is five minutes or less. Many small bees are categorized into a pain level of 1, with their venom containing polypeptides such as melittin, apamin, and MCD peptide. Melittin is the main toxin of bee venom, and it damages red blood cells and white blood cells. Apamin is a neurotoxin that augments polysynaptic reflexes. MCD peptide destroys mast cells. Feeling only slight pain, Schmidt described the sting of an urban digger bee, categorized into pain level 1, as "almost pleasant, a lover just bit your earlobe a little too hard." Also rated into pain level 1, Schmidt has described the sting of a sweat bee as "light, ephemeral, almost fruity. A tiny spark has singed a single hair on your arm."
Level 2	Schmidt set the sting of the Western honey bee at a pain level of 2 to be the anchoring value, basing his categorization of all other stings on it. He has categorized a variety of wasps, bees, and ants into pain level 2, including yellowjackets, the Asiatic honey bee, the trap-jaw ant, and the bald-faced hornet. The duration of the pain of the stings in this level is generally between five and ten minutes long. Schmidt categorized the majority of Hymenopteran stings as having a pain level of 2. The sting of a termite-raiding ant, categorized as a pain level of 2, has a similar feeling as "the debilitating pain of a migraine contained in the tip of your finger," according to Schmidt. A yellowjacket's sting was described as being "hot and smoky, almost irreverent. Imagine W. C. Fields extinguishing a cigar on your tongue." He also described the sting of the honeybee as a similar feeling to "The oven mitt had a hole in it when you pulled the cookies out of the oven."
Level 3	Most insects that are characterized as having a pain level of 3 are wasps, including the neotropical red paper wasp, the red-headed paper wasp, and Klug's velvet ant (a wingless wasp and not a true ant). The duration of the sting pain can range anywhere from one minute (such as the sting of the red paper wasp) to half an hour (such as the sting of the velvet ant). Wasp venom uniquely contains kinin. One of the kinins found in wasp venom, "polistes kinin 3", is found to lead to similar effects on smooth musculature and circulation as bradykinin. Some ants are also rated at a pain level 3, including the giant bull ant and the Maricopa harvester ant. Schmidt considered the sting of the Maricopa harvester ant to have a pain level of 3, describing it as such: "After eight unrelenting hours of drilling into that ingrown toenail, you find the drill wedged into the toe."
Level 4	The highest level in the Schmidt sting pain index. Schmidt's original index rated only one such example, the sting of the bullet ant Paraponera clavata, as a 4. He wrote, "Paraponera clavata stings induced immediate, excruciating pain and numbness to pencil-point pressure, as well as trembling in the form of a totally uncontrollable urge to shake the affected part." In a later work, he described the sting as "pure, intense, brilliant pain...like walking over flaming charcoal with a three-inch nail embedded in your heel." The bullet ant's venom primarily contains poneratoxin, a paralyzing neurotoxic peptide. He later gave the sting of a tarantula hawk species, Pepsis grossa, (Note: Reported under its synonym, P. formosa) a rating of a 4, which he described as "blinding, fierce [and] shockingly electric", though the duration of pain from the sting is short-lived, lasting only approximately five minutes. The composition of tarantula hawk venom is unknown. He also later rated the sting of Synoeca septentrionalis as a 4, describing it as "Torture. You are chained in the flow of an active volcano. Why did I start this list?", saying the pain lasts up to two hours.

== Entire scale ==
Schmidt's entire list of ratings and descriptions:

Category	Name	Latin name	Range	Description	Pain Level
ant	Indian jumping ant	Harpegnathos saltator	Asia	Ah, that wonderful wakeup feeling, like coffee but oh so bitter.	1
ant	Delicate trap-jaw ant	Anochetus inermis	South America	A tiny spark, just enough to rouse you from a dreamy stroll in the woods. A slight jolt as you return to reality.	1
ant	n/a	Bothroponera striglosa (A type of African black ant)	Africa	Timid but not painless. A pebble kicked up by a passing car ricochets off your ankle.	1
ant	Asian needle ant	Brachyponera chinensis	Native to Asia	Nightfall following a day at the beach. You forgot the sunscreen. Your burned nose lets you know.	1
ant	Big-eyed ant	Opthalmopone berthoudi	Africa	A sharp interruption as you absorb the beauty of Africa. An acacia spine just poked through your sandal.	1
ant	n/a	Ectatomma ruidum (A type of black ant)	Central America & South America	A brief searing, like tuna on a grill. The bottom of your foot is blanched but not cooked through.	1
ant	n/a	Leptogenes kitteli (A type of Asian army ant)	Asia	Simple and plain. A loose carpet tack pierces the ball of your wool-socked foot.	1
ant	Elongate twig ant	Pseudomyrmex gracilis	North America, Central America & South America	Reminiscent of a childhood bully. Intimidating, but his punch only glanced your chin, and you live for another day.	1
ant	Slender twig ant	Tetraponera sp.	Asia	A skinny bully's punch. It's too weak to hurt but you suspect a cheap trick might be coming.	1
ant	Red fire ant	Solenopsis invicta	Native to South America	Sharp, sudden, mildly alarming. Like walking across a shag carpet and reaching for the light switch.	1
ant	Tropical fire ant	Solenopsis geminata	Native to Central America & South America	You should have learned, but the carpet is the same, and when you again reach for the light switch, the shock mocks you.	1
ant	Southern fire ant	Solenopsis xyloni	North America	It happens on the third day, as you reach for the light switch, and you're wondering when you will ever learn.	1
ant	European fire ant	Myrmica rubra	Native to Europe	The prickle of stinging nettles against your skin on a hot, humid day.	1
ant	Samsum ant	Euponera sennaarensis	Africa	Pure, sharp, piercing pain. You pressed your thumb on a tack.	1.5
ant	Suturing army ant	Eciton burchellii	Central America & South America	A cut on your elbow, stitched with a rusty needle.	1.5
ant	n/a	Ectatomma tuberculatum (A large golden ant)	Central America & South America	A slow stream of hot wax poured over your wrist. You want to twist away but can't.	1.5
ant	Giant ant	Dinoponera gigantea	South America	A pulsing sting with some flavor. You stepped into a salt bath with an open wound.	1.5
ant	Giant stink ant	Paltothyreus tarsatus	Africa	You must have upset the nurses. They stuck you with a big needle and then dribbled in garlic oil.	1.5
ant	Bulldog ant #1	Myrmecia simillima	Australia	Intense, ripping, and sharp. The dog's tooth found its mark.	1.5
ant	Red bull ant	Myrmecia gulosa	Australia	A sneaky, unassuming ache. Like a brightly colored LEGO, charming till it's lodged in the arch of your foot in the dark.	1.5
ant	Bulldog ant #2	Myrmecia rufinodis	Australia	Shockingly sharp. A scalpel just lanced your palm.	1.5
ant	Metabele ant	Megaponera analis	Africa	A child's arrow misses its target and finds its home in your calf.	1.5
ant	n/a	Ectatomma quadridens (A type of big black ant)	South America	A burning itch to catch your attention, followed by regret, like ordering spicy chicken wings when you have a mouth sore.	1.5
ant	Bullhorn acacia ant	Pseudomyrmex nigrocinctus	Central America	A rare, piercing, elevated sort of pain. Someone has fired a staple into your cheek.	1.5
ant	Jack jumper ant	Myrmecia pilosula	Australia	The oven mitt had a hole in it when you pulled the cookies out of the oven.	2
ant	Metallic green ant	Rhytidoponera metallica	Australia	Deceptively painful. Like biting into a green bell pepper to find it is a habanero chili.	2
ant	n/a	Diacamma sp. (A type of black ant)	Asia	Nothing subtle about this one. Sudden and striking, a shard of glass on a tropical beach pulls you out of the moment as it finds a nerve in your bare foot.	2
ant	Large tropical black ant	Neoponera villosa	North America, Central America & South America	Exquisitely sharp and expertly clean. Broadway's favorite barber selects his next victim.	2
ant	n/a	Neoponera crassinoda (A type of big black ant)	South America	This one packs a punch. The dentist should have given that novocaine more time to take effect.	2
ant	Termite-raiding ant	Neoponera commutate	South America	The debilitating pain of a migraine contained in the tip of your finger. And their queen can sting like her sisters!	2
ant	African giant ant	Streblognathus aethiopicus	Africa	The white hot burn of a barbecue fork impaling your hand, paired with the grizzle of a serrated knife.	2
ant	n/a	Platythyrea lamellose (A purplish ant)	Africa	Relentless prickling throughout your body. Like wearing a wool jumpsuit laced with pine needles and poison ivy.	2
ant	n/a	Platythyrea pilosula (A sleek ant)	Africa	A torturous itch and rash with serious lasting power. Should have spent the extra money and paid for a licensed tattoo artist.	2.5
ant	Trap-jaw ant	Odontomachus spp.	Tropics worldwide	Instantaneous and excruciating. A rat trap snaps your index fingernail.	2.5
ant	Florida harvester ant	Pogonomyrmex badius	North America	Bold and unrelenting. Somebody is using a power drill to excavate your ingrown toenail.	3
ant	Maricopa harvester ant	Pogonomyrmex maricopa	North America	After eight unrelenting hours of drilling into that ingrown toenail, you find the drill is wedged in the toe.	3
ant	Argentine harvester ant	Ephebomyrmex cunicularis	South America	A ferocious pang lasting 12 hours or more. Flesheating bacteria dissolve your muscles, one by precious one.	3
ant	Bullet ant	Paraponera clavata	Central America & South America	Pure, intense, brilliant pain. Like walking over flaming charcoal with a 3-inch nail embedded in your heel.	4
bee	n/a	Triepeolus sp. (A type of parasitic bee)	North America	Did I just imagine that? A little scratch that dances with a tickle.	0.5
bee	Anthophorid bee	Emphoropsis pallida	North America	Almost pleasant, a lover just bit your earlobe a little too hard.	1
bee	Sweat bees	Lasioglossum spp.	North America	Light and ephemeral, almost fruity. A tiny spark has singed a single hair on your arm.	1
bee	Cactus bee	Diadasia rinconis	North America	A skewering message: get lost. Surprising, because you did not touch a cactus spine, until you realize it's from a bee.	1
bee	Cuckoo bee	Ericrocis lata	North America	Touch of fear unrealized. Oh, and I wanted to show how brave I was!	1
bee	Giant sweat bee	Dieunomia heteropoda	North America	Size matters but isn't everything. A silver tablespoon drops squarely onto your big toenail, sending you hopping.	1.5
bee	Western honey bee	Apis mellifera	Native to Africa and Europe	Burning, corrosive, but you can handle it. A flaming match head lands on your arm and is quenched first with lye and then sulfuric acid.	2
bee	Western honey bee	Apis mellifera (A special case, tongue)	Native to Africa and Europe	It's crawled into your soda can and stings you on the tongue. It's immediate, noisome, visceral, debilitating. For 10 minutes life is not worth living.	3
bee	Bumble bees	Bombus spp.	North America	Colorful flames. Fireworks land on your arm.	2
bee	California carpenter bee	Xylocopa californica	North America	Swift, sharp, and decisive. Your fingertip has been slammed by a car door.	2
bee	Giant Bornean carpenter bee	Xylocopa sp.	Asia	Electrifying, sharp, and piercing. Next time hire an electrician.	2.5
wasp	Club-horned wasp	Sapyga pumila	North America	Disappointing. A paperclip falls on your bare foot.	0.5
wasp	Potter wasp	Eumeninae sp.	North America	Looks deceive. Rich and full-bodied in appearance but flavorless.	0.5
wasp	Little wasp	Polybia occidentalis	Central America & South America	Sharp meets spice. A slender cactus spine brushed a Buffalo wing before it poked your arm.	1
wasp	Great black wasp	Sphex pensylvanicus	North America	Simple and presumptuous. Your younger sibling just nipped at your pinkie finger.	1
wasp	Iridescent cockroach hunter	Chlorion cyaneum	North America	Itchy with a hint of sharpness. A single stinging nettle pricked your hand.	1
wasp	Scarab hunter wasp	Triscolia ardens	North America	Like a sip of tannin, bitterness lingers.	1
wasp	Water-walking wasp	Euodynerus crypticus	North America	Clever, but trivial? A little like magic in that you cannot quite figure out the difference between pain and illusion.	1
wasp	Mud dauber	Sceliphron caementarium	Native to North America	Sharp with a flare of heat. Jalapeño cheese when you were expecting Havarti.	1
wasp	Little white velvet ant	Dasymutilla thetis	North America	Deceptive, like the name. Immediate, rashy, you want to scratch away the kiss of itch. A sand crab pinched your toe while you tanned.	1
wasp	Pacific cicada killer	Sphecius convallis	North America	Clean. Concentrated dish detergent seeps into a freshly cut finger.	1
wasp	Western cicada killer	Sphecius grandis	North America	Pain at first sight. Like poison oak, the more you rub, the worse it gets.	1.5
wasp	n/a	Eumeninae sp. (A yellow potter wasp)	North America	A surprising touch of nasty. Like a thorn hidden on the back of a rose stem as you clutch the bouquet.	1.5
wasp	n/a	Mutillidae sp. (A nocturnal velvet ant)	North America	Itch, burn, and more itch. A toothpick dipped in both itch powder and hot sauce is stuck in your thigh.	1.5
wasp	Paper wasp	Polistes versicolor	Central America & South America	Burning, throbbing, and lonely. A single drop of superheated frying oil landed on your arm.	1.5
wasp	Thread- waisted paper wasp	Belonogaster sp.	Africa	Attention getting. Like the time your classmate stabbed you with a pencil point.	1.5
wasp	Ferocious polybia wasp	Polybia rejecta	Central America & South America	Like a trick gone wrong. Your posterior is a target for a BB gun. Bull's-eye, over and over.	1.5
wasp	Baldfaced hornet	Dolichovespula maculata	North America	Rich, hearty, slightly crunchy. Similar to getting your hand mashed in a revolving door.	2
wasp	n/a	Mischocyttarus sp. (A type of paper wasp)	North America, Central America & South America	Robust, a full-bodied wake-up call. Imagine a pair of pliers latched onto your upper lip.	2
wasp	Colonial thread-waisted	Belonogaster juncea colonialis	Africa	Tenacious in a stringy way. Tangy. You can't extract yourself from the man-o-war's tentacles.	2
wasp	Unstable paper wasp	Polistes instabilis	Central America	Like a dinner guest who stays much too long, the pain drones on. A hot Dutch oven lands on your hand and you can't get it off.	2
wasp	Honey wasp	Brachygastra mellifica	North America & Central America	Spicy, blistering. A cotton swab dipped in habanero sauce has been pushed up your nose.	2
wasp	Artistic wasp	Parachartergus fraternus	Central America & South America	Pure, then messy, then corrosive. Love and marriage followed by divorce.	2
wasp	Western yellowjacket	Vespula pensylvanica	North America	Hot and smoky, almost irreverent. Imagine W. C. Fields extinguishing a cigar on your tongue.	2
wasp	Glorious velvet ant	Dasymutilla gloriosa	North America	Instantaneous, like the surprise of being stabbed. Is this what shrapnel feels like?	2
wasp	Nocturnal hornet	Provespa sp.	Asia	Rude, insulting. An ember from your campfire is glued to your forearm.	2.5
wasp	Golden paper wasp	Polistes aurifer	North America & Central America	Sharp, piercing, and immediate. You know what cattle feel when they are branded.	2.5
wasp	Yellow fire wasp	Agelaia myrmecophila	Central America & South America	An odd, distressing pain. Tiny blowtorches kiss your arms and legs.	2.5
wasp	Fierce black polybia wasp	Polybia simillima	Central America	A ritual gone wrong, satanic. The gas lamp in the old church explodes in your face when you light it.	2.5
wasp	Giant paper wasp	Megapolistes sp.	New Guinea	There are gods, and they do throw thunderbolts. Poseidon just rammed his trident into your breast.	3
wasp	Red paper wasp	Polistes canadensis	Central America	Caustic and burning, with a distinctly bitter aftertaste. Like spilling a beaker of hydrochloric acid on a paper cut.	3
wasp	Red-headed paper wasp	Polistes erythrocephalis	Central America & South America	Immediate, irrationally intense, and unrelenting. This is the closest you will come to seeing the blue of a flame from within the fire.	3
wasp	n/a	Dasymutilla klugii (A huge velvet ant)	North America	Explosive and long lasting, you sound insane as you scream. Hot oil from the deep fryer spilling over your entire hand.	3
wasp	Tarantula hawk	Pepsis spp.	North America, Central America & South America	Blinding, fierce, shockingly electric. A running hair dryer has just been dropped into your bubble bath.	4
wasp	Warrior (or armadillo) wasp	Synoeca septentrionalis	Central America & South America	Torture. You are chained in the flow of an active volcano. Why did I start this list?	4

== Legacy ==
While Schmidt's published scientific papers use a 1 through 4 number scale, an entry in The Straight Dope reported that "implausibly exact numbers" such as "bullhorn acacia ant at 1.8" were "wheedled out of him" by Outside magazine for an article it published in 1996.

In September 2015, Schmidt and Michael L. Smith were co-awarded the Ig Nobel Physiology and Entomology prize for their Hymenoptera research.

The Starr sting pain scale is based on the Schmidt index.

== See also ==
- Dol scale to measure pain
- Kings of Pain, a TV series with another pain index
