= Kings of Pain =

- Starring: Adam Thorn; Rob Alleva
- Narrated by: Jim Pratt
- Country of origin: United States
- Original language: English
- No. of seasons: 2
- No. of episodes: 19

Production
- Executive producers: David Carr; Ben Silverman; Howard Owens; Laurie Girion; Brett-Patrick Jenkins; J.D. Roth; Adam Greener
- Producers: Isabel San Vargas; Lucy Savage
- Production location: Worldwide
- Production company: Propagate

Original release
- Network: History Channel
- Release: November 12, 2019 – September 17, 2022

Kings of Pain is an American television series that aired on the History Channel. The show features Adam Thorn, a wildlife biologist, and Rob "Caveman" Alleva, an animal handler. In the show, they attempt to get stung and bitten by animals from different parts of the world, in order to measure the amount of pain they each receive from each bite or sting.

Amid speculation, the show was renewed and returned subsequently for season 2 on May 26, 2022.

== Concept ==
Inspired by the Schmidt Pain Index, biologist Adam Thorn and handler Rob "Caveman" Alleva test the bites and stings of animals with a new 30 point scale within 3 categories: intensity of initial physical pain, the duration of the pain, and the after effects or "damage". The scores from the three are rated from 1-10 (10 being worst) and then added together and averaged out.

The animal is then ranked among the scale using the honeybee sting as the baseline. Along with creatures from the Schmidt Pain Index, animals from other categories such as reptiles and marine animals are also tested. In addition to testing the bites and stings of animals, Thorn and Alleva have started another pain index which they call the "nature hurts" pain index, which is intended to measure the pain from hot peppers.

== Episodes ==
Season	Episodes	Originally released	
Season	Episodes	First released	Last released
1	9	November 12, 2019	January 14, 2020
2	10	May 26, 2022	September 17, 2022

=== Season 1 (2019–20) ===
No. overall	No. in season	Title	Species	Location	Original release date
1	1	"Nightmare in a Box"	Executioner Wasp, Warrior Wasp, and Goliath Bird-Eating Tarantula	Bolivia	November 12, 2019
2	2	"Stinging Punishment"	South African Bark Scorpion, Lesser-Thicktail Scorpion and Lion Fish	South Africa	November 19, 2019
3	3	"Fairy of Death"	Mexican Harvester Ant, Tarantula Hawk and Crown-of-Thorns Starfish	Mexico	November 26, 2019
4	4	"World of Hurt"	Nile Monitor Lizard and Dolichomutilla sycorax	Africa	December 3, 2019
5	5	"Point of the Dead"	Toe biter and Scorpionfish	Baja	December 10, 2019
6	6	"Fire Down Below"	Fire Urchin and Rove beetle	Bali	December 17, 2019
7	7	"Big Box of Pain"	Bullet Ant and Piranha	Amazon	January 7, 2020
8	8	"Execution Day"	Giant Asian Centipede and Reticulated Python	Indonesia	January 14, 2020
9	9	"Behind the Bites"	Tokay Gecko, Slow Loris, Bolivian Tarantula Hawk and Hot Pepper Challenge	N/A	January 14, 2020

=== Season 2 (2022) ===
No. overall	No. in season	Title	Species	Location	Original release date
10	1	"The Scorpion King"	Giant Desert Hairy Scorpion and Arizona Bark Scorpion	Arizona, United States	May 26, 2022
11	2	"Arachnophobia"	Brazilian Black and White Tarantula and Orange Baboon Tarantula	California, United States	June 2, 2022
12	3	"Big Biting Lizards"	Black-throated Monitor Lizard and Mexican Beaded Lizard	California, United States	June 9, 2022
13	4	"Schmidt Happens"	Red Imported Fire Ants, Sacken's Velvet Ant and California Harvester Ant	California, United States	June 16, 2022
14	5	"Hundred Tiny Screams"	Common Desert Centipede and Giant Desert Centipede	Arizona, United States	June 23, 2022
15	6	"Backyard Beasts"	Horrid King Assassin Bug, Jerusalem Cricket and Brown Widow	Arizona, United States	June 30, 2022
16	7	"Aquarium Nightmares"	Blue Tang, Peacock Mantis Shrimp and Double Bar Rabbitfish	California, United States	July 7, 2022
17	8	"Electrocution"	Yellowhead Moray Eel and Electric Eel	California, United States	July 14, 2022
18	9	"Stinging Sharks"	Port Jackson Shark and California Horn Shark	California, United States	July 21, 2022
19	10	"Cocktail of Venom"	Bristle Worms and Striped Eel Catfish	California, United States	July 21, 2022
