= Neoponera verenae =

Scientific classification
- Kingdom: Animalia
- Phylum: Arthropoda
- Clade: Pancrustacea
- Class: Insecta
- Order: Hymenoptera
- Family: Formicidae
- Genus: Neoponera
- Species: N. verenae

Binomial name
- Neoponera verenae Forel, 1922

Species of ant

Neoponera verenae is a species of ponerine ant in the genus Neoponera.

== Identification ==
There are only a few species of Neoponera in which the workers lack erect hairs on the dorsum of the mesosoma (N. magnifica, N. bucki, N. apicalis, N. obscuricornis and N. verenae). However, in N. apicalis, the tips of the antennae has a yellow to light brown funiculus. To narrow down identification, only N. verenae, N. apicalis and N. obscuricornis have eyes that take up more than 1/3 of the side of the head. The difference between N. obscuricornis and N. verenae is that the posterior lateral margins of the petiole of N. verenae are sharp, those of N. obscuricornis are broadly rounded.
