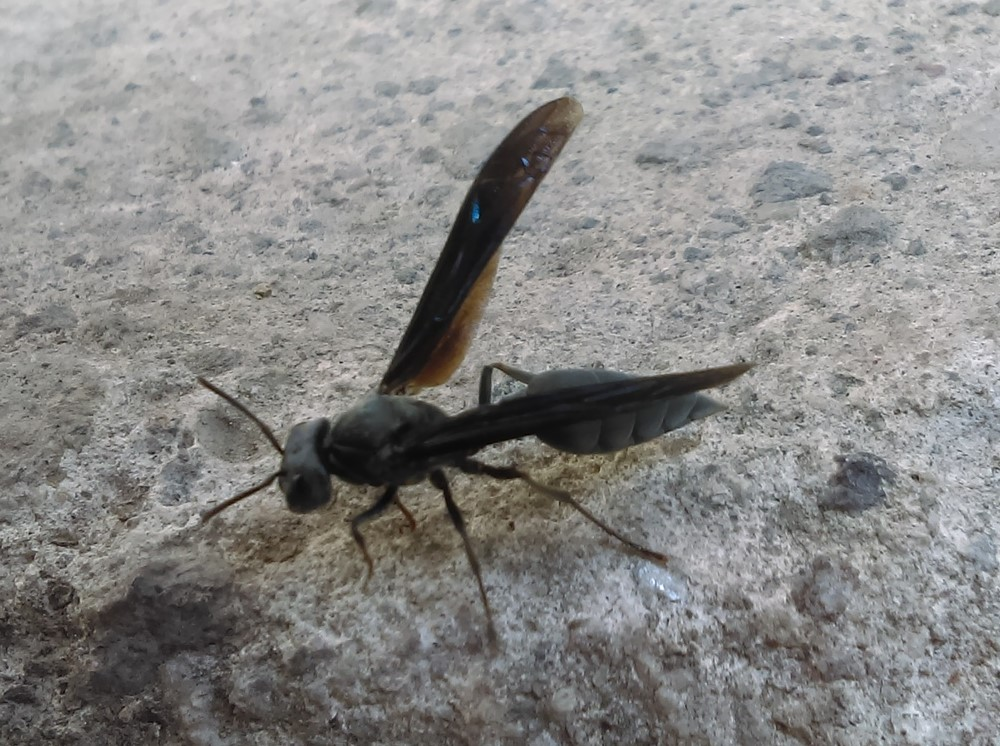

Scientific classification
- Kingdom: Animalia
- Phylum: Arthropoda
- Clade: Pancrustacea
- Class: Insecta
- Order: Hymenoptera
- Family: Vespidae
- Genus: Synoeca
- Species: S. septentrionalis

Binomial name
- Synoeca septentrionalis (Richards, 1978)

= Synoeca septentrionalis =

Species of stinging wasp

Synoeca septentrionalis is one of five species of wasps in the genus Synoeca. It is a swarm-founding wasp that is also eusocial, exhibiting complicated nest structure and defense mechanisms and a colony cycle including a pre-emergence phase and a post-emergence phase. It is typically found in areas from Central to South America. This wasp is one of the larger species of paper wasps and exhibits multiple morphological adaptations as a result of this. Synoeca septentrionalis is known for possessing an extremely painful sting.

== Taxonomy and phylogeny ==
Synoeca septentrionalis is one of five species of wasp in the genus Synoeca, with the other four being S. chalybea, S. cyanea, S. surinama, and S. virginea. Wasps in the genus Synoeca are often referred to as warrior wasps and are found in various areas in the Americas. Each wasp in the genus exhibits similar characteristics, but from a phylogenetic standpoint, S. septentrionalis is most closely related to S. surinama and S. cyanea. The wasps in this genus are also a part of the paper wasp tribe known as Epiponini, which are Neotropical. In general, the genus is quite aggressive and will often display cohesive defense mechanisms when threatened.

== Description and identification ==
Synoeca septentrionalis exhibits a blackish or dark blue color and has a metallic-like appearance. Their wings are also quite large and are entirely infuscate. Their metasomal tergum (a portion of the abdomen) and sternum both exhibit erect hairs, and their clypeus is imprinted with an area that resembles a dark triangle. Color patterns vary among the species; some exhibit a reddish color, while others are completely darkened. Overall, they are a medium-sized wasp with lengths of approximately 20 millimetres (0.79 in).

They are considered to be paper wasps, as their nests are made out of paper. Their nests will change as a colony grows. Typically, they will start as one comb within a ridged, domed envelope that also has a hole or holes where other lobes can be added as necessary. Most nests have only two to three lobes, but nests with nine lobes that span over three meters have been reported. Occasionally, some of the holes will be paired as two, and, combined, they have a perimeter of 10–12 centimetres (3.9–4.7 in). Certain holes will remain open and act as entrances or exits for S. septentrionalis.

== Distribution and habitat ==
Synoeca septentrionalis is a Neotropical species found in Central and South America, especially in areas such as Costa Rica, Panama, Colombia, Guatemala, Mexico and Venezuela. Its distribution extends further north than others in the genus.

These wasps often build their nests on trees, specifically flat against a tree trunk or a limb. Nests have been seen between 1.70 and 6 meters above the ground.

== Colony cycle ==
As a swarm founding species, S. septentrionalis travels and founds new colonies as a large group. In S. septentrionalis, nest construction will begin when the swarm has all arrived at the potential construction site. This marks the beginning of the pre-emergence phase. Construction is typically done by a group of workers, and, by the time the nest is completed a few days later, eggs will have been laid in the cells by the queen.

Roughly a week after the nest is complete, the first larvae begin to hatch, and these will become adults approximately 30 days after hatching, marking the end of the pre-emergence phase and the beginning of the post emergence phase. It is at this point when the emergence of workers is largely dependent on the necessity to produce reproductive females that will become queens. Because S. septentrionalis is a polygynous species, more than one queen will exist at a given time, and often the number of queens will fluctuate. When queen number is small, the ratio of queens to workers will be low and thus the queens will have difficulty suppressing reproduction in subordinate females, of which some will become additional queens. When queen number is high, the ratio of queen to workers is higher, and suppressing reproduction in subordinate females is easier.

Normally, in wasps residing in a temperate climate, the nesting cycle and the colony cycle are one and the same, meaning that a colony will use one nest per reproductive episode. However, species such as S. septentrionalis primarily reside in a tropical climate, and this congruency is disrupted, as they may stay in the same nest for more than one reproductive cycle. As a result, they exhibit an "intermediate nesting cycle", in which the benefits of staying in the same nest for another colony cycle outweigh the costs of staying in the nest.

== Behavior ==
=== Movement between nest sites ===
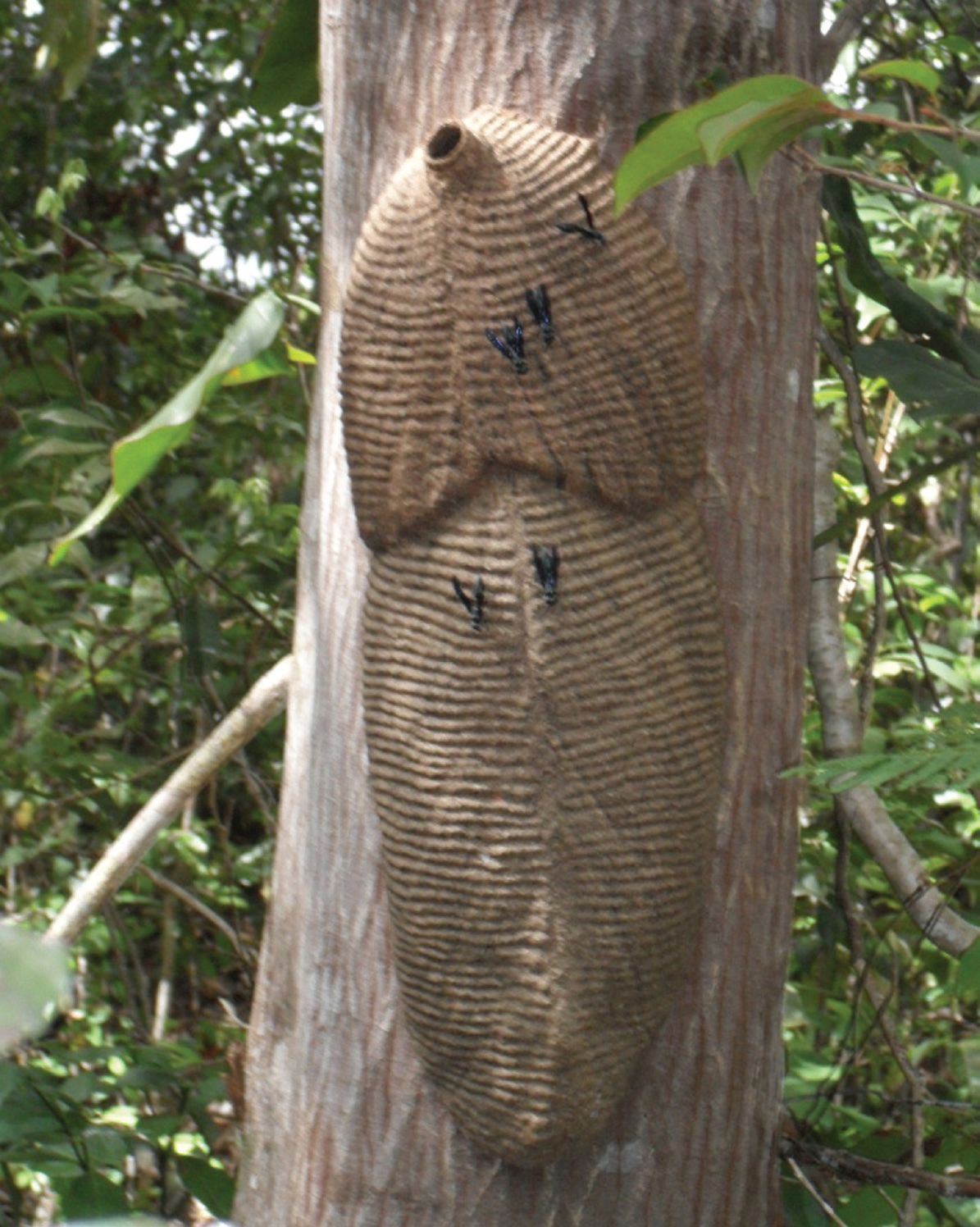
Nest of Synoeca septentrionalis collected in Bahia.

It has been seen that, when moving as a swarm between nests or to a new nest, S. septentrionalis will use various means of communication to facilitate group movement. This is most often done through the use of pheromones. When moving from an old to a new nest site, the wasps will rub glands located on or near their gasters on various spots between the nest sites. These creates a trail of chemical pheromones between the two sites that the wasps are able to follow. Along with this "gaster-rubbing," S. septentrionalis will often chew and lick leaves on the pathway between the two sites, thus enhancing their methods of communication. Polybia sericea is another species that moves between nest sites using pheromones.

=== Nest entrances and exits ===
S. septentrionalis is unique to the genus Synoeca in that its nests will typically contain two entrance or exit holes, whereas the nests of other species in the genus will usually only contain one hole. Within the nests, the wasps will often choose one hole as a preferred "entrance point" and another as a preferred "exit point" as opposed to entering either one at random. It is likely that determinations for which hole to use as an entrance or exit arise as a result of the behavioral patterns and the efficiency with which each individual hive operates.

== Adaptations relating to body size ==
The wasps within the family Vespidae exhibit a wide range of body sizes, and S. septentrionalis is one of the larger wasps within the family. As a result, they are able to generate a lift force that is able to maintain flight in the presence of their large muscle mass. In order for this to occur in the most efficient manner possible, these wasps have enlarged wings and veins that are distally extended. The elongated wings allow for flying that is more energetically efficient, in order to compensate for their large body size and muscle mass, while the distally-organized veins prevent bending of the wings, which would result in a loss of energy.

== Kin selection ==
=== Cyclical oligogyny ===
Synoeca septentrionalis exhibit a behavior that is known as "cyclical oligogyny," where there are varying numbers of queens per colony cycle. When the number of queens becomes low within a colony, they will signal to new females for them to try to become queens and repopulate the nest with queens. As evidence of this, it has been found that in most swarming colonies such as S. septentrionalis, the population of queens is bimodal with respect to age; some queens are very old while others are very young.

=== Physiological differentiation ===
Because morphology differences cannot dictate caste differences in S. septentrionalis, due to morphological similarity, castes are determined by adult disputes as opposed to manipulation at the larval stage. In colonies with already-established queens, workers will display aggressive behavior in order to inhibit female ovary development. Females with limited ovary development exhibit stringed, filamentous ovaries that do not have a mature oocyte and cannot contain sperm. When workers are not preventing female development, they are raised in an orphanage-like manner where they are able to develop full ovaries with multiple oocytes that can maintain sperm. These are ultimately the females that are able to take a chance to become a queen.

== Interactions with other species ==
=== Predation ===
Synoeca septentrionalis is preyed upon by numerous species. This is largely because it resides at an elevation of 300 meters above sea level, a lower elevation than most paper wasps. Specifically, army ants will regularly feed on them along with other species of paper wasps. This prevalent predation has resulted in S. septentrionalis making numerous adaptations, some of which include forming a complex nest structure, choosing a nest-site that reduces exposure to predators, and establishing defensive mechanisms. S. septentrionalis has also been known to defend against army ants by piling their bodies up against the nest entrance. However, army ant predation can be extreme enough to regulate the density of a colony and keep populations of S. septentrionalis and other species of paper wasps regulated.

=== Colony defense ===
The defensive behavior in S. septentrionalis often involves a large number of workers leaving the nest in order to display or attack with their stingers in response to a disturbance. Often, after the wasps leave the nest, they will display their gaster in such a way that it is perpendicular to the ground and the rest of their body; this behavior is defined as gaster-flagging. From a defensive standpoint, it is likely that gaster-flagging serves as a warning signal to predators that S. septentrionalis will engage in defensive stinging behavior if necessary. Likewise, gaster-flagging could potentially serve as a visual communication method between other members of the colony in order to mobilize them in the presence of a threat.

Along with gaster-flagging, S. septentrionalis will warn the colony when it is disturbed by drumming the inside of the nest, creating a characteristic alarm sound. To make the sound, the wasps scrape their mandibles across the nest walls. This is a characteristic defensive mechanism that all species of the genus Synoeca exhibit.

=== Commensalism with Montezuma oropendola ===
The Montezuma oropendola (Psarocolius montezuma) is a tropical bird that shares a similar distribution to S. septentrionalis. It has been observed that more of these birds will nest in trees that are tall, umbrella-shaped, and exhibit a presence of wasps, specifically S. septentrionalis. The wasps will utilize their defensive mechanisms and stings in order to deter both predators and ectoparasites. As a result, S. septentrionalis can exist in a commensalistic relationship with Montezuma oropendola.

== Human importance ==
This wasp species has an incredibly painful sting. On the Schmidt sting pain index it is ranked 4 out of a possible 4, on par with the sting of a bullet ant. Justin Schmidt, the author of the index wrote of the sting in his book The Sting of the Wild: "Torture. You are chained in the flow of an active volcano. Why did I start this list?" Similarly, out of a possible 4 points on the Starr sting pain scale, S. septentrionalis received a 4, a rating attained by very few other species assayed. A 4/4 on this scale means that the sting is considered to be "traumatically painful" and often requires some medical attention.
