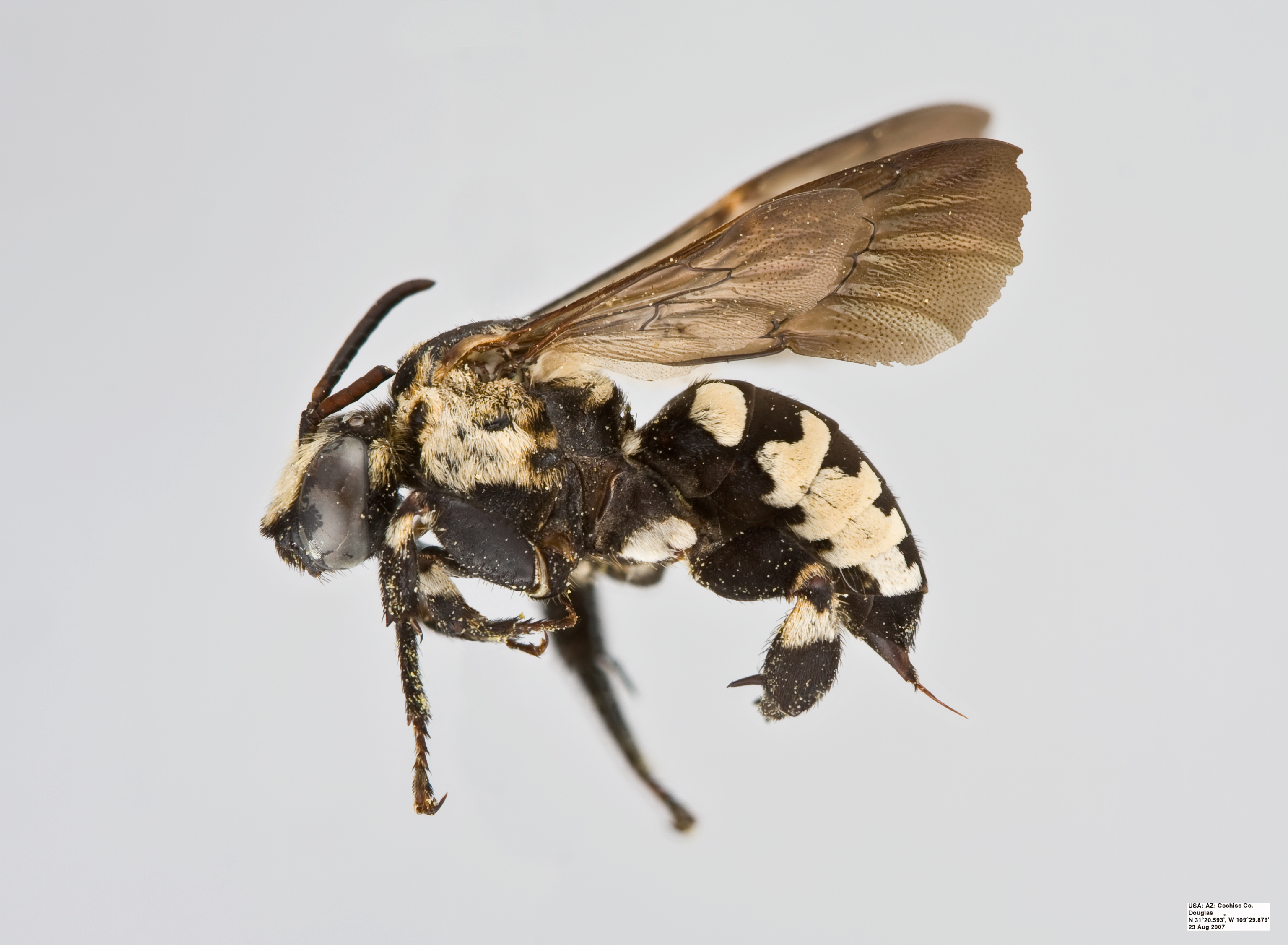
- Ericrocis pintada

Scientific classification
- Domain: Eukaryota
- Kingdom: Animalia
- Phylum: Arthropoda
- Class: Insecta
- Order: Hymenoptera
- Family: Apidae
- Subfamily: Apinae
- Tribe: Ericrocidini
- Genus: Ericrocis; Cresson, 1887

= Ericrocis =

Genus of bees

Ericrocis is a genus of cuckoo bees in the family Apidae. There are at least four described species in Ericrocis.

== Species ==
These four species belong to the genus Ericrocis:

- Ericrocis arizonensis Baker
- Ericrocis lata (Cresson, 1878)
- Ericrocis melectoides Baker
- Ericrocis pintada Snelling & Zavortink, 1984
