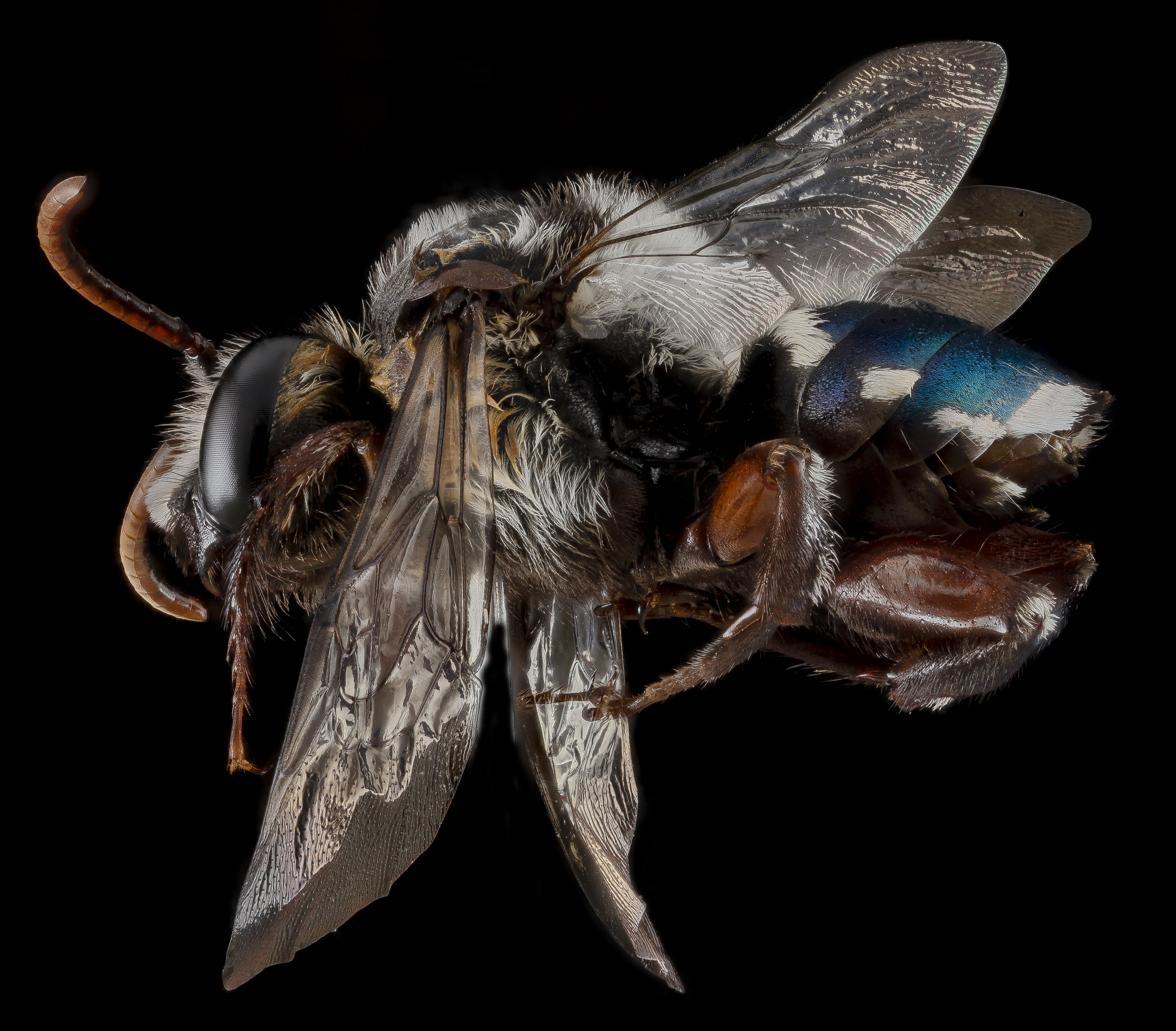

Scientific classification
- Kingdom: Animalia
- Phylum: Arthropoda
- Class: Insecta
- Order: Hymenoptera
- Family: Apidae
- Tribe: Ericrocidini
- Genus: Mesoplia; Lepeletier, 1841

= Mesoplia =

Genus of bees

Mesoplia is a genus of cuckoo bees in the family Apidae. There are 17 described species in Mesoplia.

== Species ==
- Mesoplia alboguttata (Ducke, 1905)
- Mesoplia azurea (Lepeletier & Audinet-Serville, 1825)
- Mesoplia bifrons (Fabricius, 1804)
- Mesoplia chalybaea (Friese, 1912)
- Mesoplia decorata (Smith, 1854)
- Mesoplia dugesi (Cockerell, 1917)
- Mesoplia friesei (Ducke, 1902)
- Mesoplia guatemalensis Cockerell, 1912
- Mesoplia guedesii (Ducke, 1902)
- Mesoplia imperatrix (Friese, 1913)
- Mesoplia insignis (Smith, 1879)
- Mesoplia ornata (Spinola, 1841)
- Mesoplia pilicrus (Friese, 1902)
- Mesoplia regalis (Smith, 1854)
- Mesoplia rufipes (Perty, 1833)
- Mesoplia sapphirina Melo and Rocha-Filho, 2011
- Mesoplia simillima Schrottky, 1920
