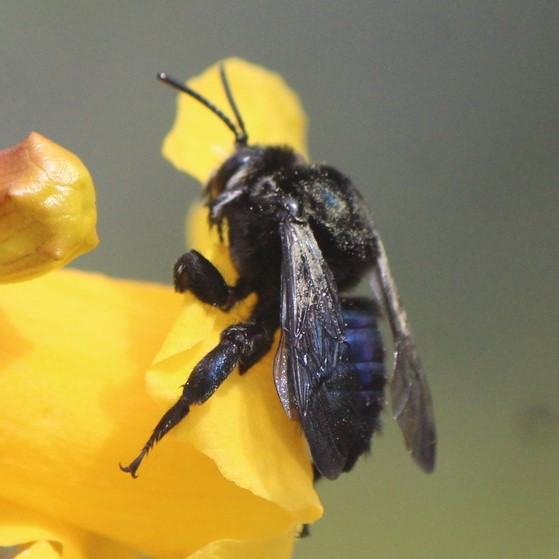

Scientific classification
- Kingdom: Animalia
- Phylum: Arthropoda
- Class: Insecta
- Order: Hymenoptera
- Family: Apidae
- Genus: Mesoplia
- Species: M. dugesi

Binomial name
- Mesoplia dugesi (Cockerell, 1917)

= Mesoplia dugesi =

Species of bee

Mesoplia dugesi is a species of bee in the family Apidae. It is found in the south-western United States (Arizona) and Mexico.
