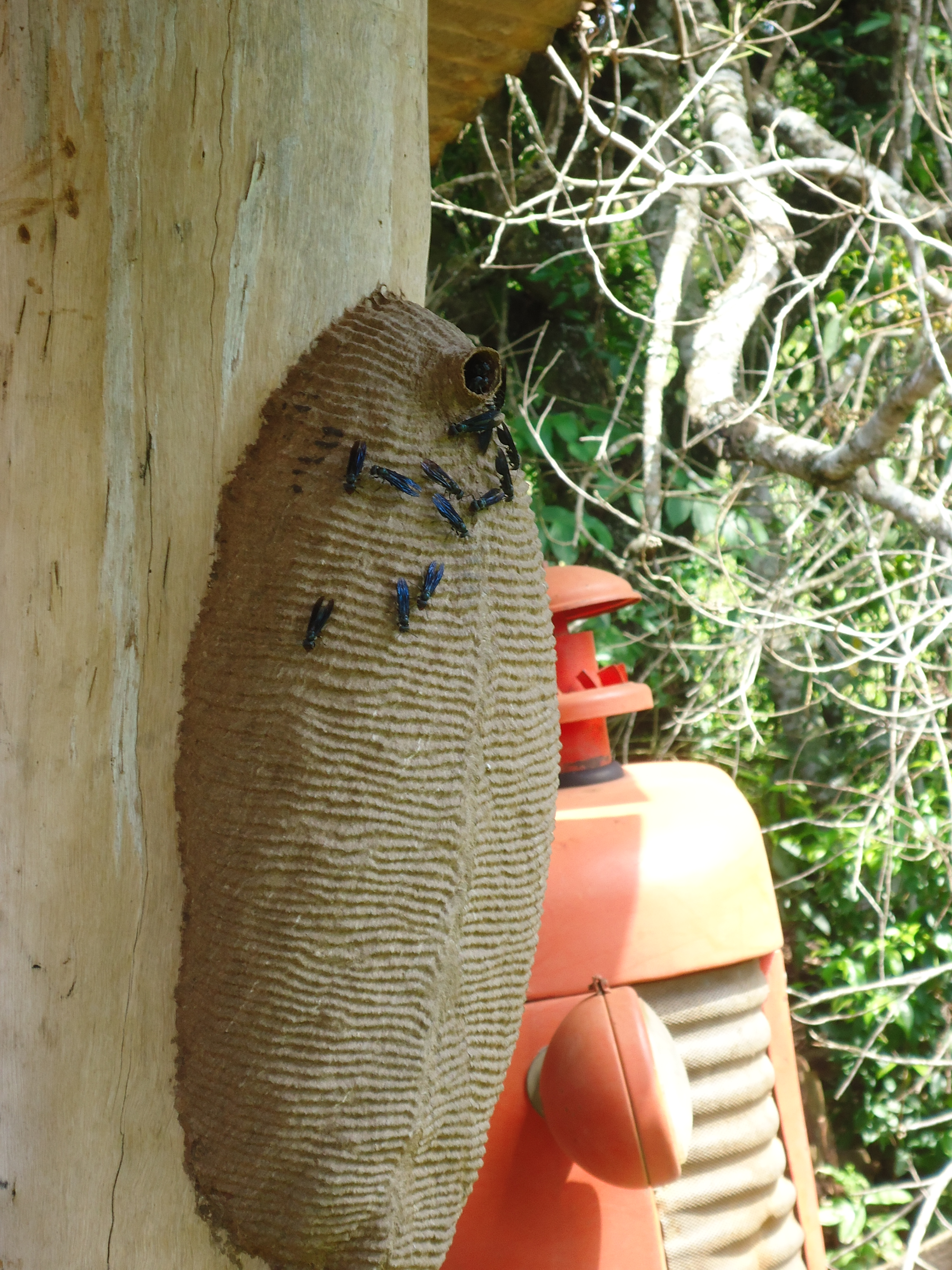
- A nest of S. cyanea

Scientific classification
- Kingdom: Animalia
- Phylum: Arthropoda
- Class: Insecta
- Order: Hymenoptera
- Family: Vespidae
- Subfamily: Polistinae
- Tribe: Epiponini
- Genus: Synoeca
- Species: S. cyanea

Binomial name
- Synoeca cyanea (Fabricius, 1775)

Synonyms
- Vespa cyanea Fabricius 1775; Synoeca azurea Saussure 1852; Synoeca ultramarina Saussure 1852; Synoeca violacea Saussure 1852

= Synoeca cyanea =

Species of wasp

Synoeca cyanea, commonly known as the marimbondo-tatu in Brazil, is a swarm-founding eusocial wasp. Native to Brazil and Argentina, S. cyanea is one of the largest and most aggressive species of social wasps and is feared in many rural areas. It begins its colony cycle in the early spring and continues until nest abandonment. Throughout its life, S. cyanea forage sugary substances and animal carcasses for food and wood pulp for its nest. S. cyanea is also known for its strong venom, which is enough to cause haemolytic activity.

== Taxonomy and phylogenetics ==
Johan Christian Fabricius, a Danish zoologist, classified S. cyanea in 1775. The genus Synoeca is a part of the paper wasp tribe Epiponini and consists of five species (S. chalibea, S. virginea, S. septentrionalis, S. surinama, and S. cyanea). Synoeca is a basal genus in the tribe. Cyanea, the adjective describing the species, translates to “dark blue,” referring to the metallic blue patches on the exterior of S. cyanea.

== Description and identification ==
S. cyanea is black with metallic blue patches on its body. In addition, S. cyanea has a red clypeus. While other species in the genus Synoeca do not demonstrate caste differences, S. cyanea sometimes shows differentiation between the size of workers and the queen. A queen of a nest that is early in development will often be the same size as the workers and intermediates as it has not fully developed its reproductive organs. As the colony and nest grow, the queen also grows in size, due to ovarian development, until it is larger than the workers and intermediates. When males are present, they are also smaller than the queen.

== Nesting ==
S. cyanea composes its nest out of a single comb with the cells directly attached to a tree. These types of nests are known as astelocyttarous nests. A corrugated, protective envelope made of wood pulp covers the nest, with the entrance on the superior portion of the nest. It is suggested that the architecture of the nest serves as protection against the predation of ants.

== Distribution and habitat ==
While the genus Synoeca is found from Mexico to Argentina, S. cyanea is native to almost the whole country of Brazil. Typically, nests are found in the Restinga and the Atlantic Rain Forest. However, S. cyanea has been known to forage and make nests in mangrove areas.

== Colony cycle ==
S. cyanea starts a new colony cycle during the spring as it gets warmer. The first stage of a new colony is known as the pre-emergence state, in which workers have not been produced. No adult offspring are present and the larvae are still very young. A pre-emergent colony can have one or more queens.

Following the pre-emergent state, the colony grows to the emergent stage. Workers are present along with larvae of different ages and multiple adult generations. In nests with fewer queens, intermediate females can be found.

S. cyanea males are present in the colony during the male-producing stage.

Upon nest abandonment during the late summer, the colony shifts to the quiescent stage, i.e. the nest site no longer houses wasps.

== Behavior ==
=== Dominance hierarchy ===
The hierarchy of S. cyanea is based on physiology, specifically ovarian development. Wasps containing undeveloped filamentous ovarioles, slightly developed oocytes, or some mature oocytes are considered workers and intermediates. Wasps with well-developed and longer ovarioles with mature oocytes become queens. The number of queens in the colony determines the development of a queen's ovaries. If there are more queens present, the ovaries are at a lower degree of development. One benefit to this is that as a swarming insect, queens with smaller abdomens are able to fly more easily than queens with larger abdomens. This makes the queen less susceptible to predators.

=== Foraging ===
Foraging activity for the swarm-founding wasp S. cyanea begins early in the morning and stops in the evening. During the hottest hours of the day, activity of the wasps is highest. In addition to temperature, S. cyanea increase their activity with decreased levels of humidity and heightened intensities of light. While foraging, the wasps collect water for temperature control, wood pulp for building and repairing the nest, sugary substances for both the larvae and adults and finally animal protein for larvae.

=== Nest repair ===
Following damage by rain to the nest, S. cyanea will seal a leak of water with their mouth-pieces. Individuals begin by suctioning the water from the wall of the nest and then finish by expelling the water to the exterior of the colony. The hole is then repaired using wood pulp.

== Kin selection ==
=== Worker-queen conflict ===
In S. cyanea, discrimination between the queen and workers is often not determined by morphology, but by physiology. Young females in the colony can develop ovaries at different points in the cycle, so castes must be determined by the adult wasps rather than at the larval stage. Often, adult wasps will manipulate young females and suppress their ovaries because a wasp becomes a queen once she has mated. The number of queens allowed in a nest often fluctuates. When queen repopulation is not needed, worker policing helps to prevent female egg-layers through egg-eating and aggressive behaviors.

== Interaction with other species ==
=== Diet ===
The wasps forage for sugary substances to feed to both larvae and adult wasps. Additionally, S. cyanea is among the species of Neotropical wasps that practices necrophagy. S. cyanea feed larvae the animal proteins collected. The wasps are predators of the coffee-leaf-miner, Leucoptera coffeella.

=== Defense ===
Characteristic to the genus, S. cyanea will sound an alarm when disturbed. This sound is made when the wasps scrape their mandibles on the carton of their nest. In addition, as one of the most aggressive social wasps, S. cyanea often will bite and sting when threatened. Their barbed sting often remains in the skin as the wasp pulls away.

== Human importance ==
=== Venom ===
S. cyanea venom is strong enough to cause haemolytic activity. Rhabdomyolysis and hemorrhage may also occur. In mice, abdominal spasms, ataxia, defecation, dyspnoea, hyperactivity, hypoactivity, sweating, and throes were observed following venom injection. S. cyanea venom also contains some antibacterial activity.

Human accidents with wasps can occur one of two ways. Either a human may receive no more than one or two stings, or a swarm may attack a human. Symptoms following the attack can range from inflammatory reactions to severe allergic reactions resulting in anaphylactic shock. In some cases, death may occur following several stings and a large amount of venom injection; however, a wasp sting typically will not produce a reaction more severe than local symptoms that affect only the skin.

=== Biocontrol agent ===
In Brazil, the fruit fly Zaprionus indianus is a common pest species that inflicts damage to multiple types of fruit trees. Since S. cyanea may obtain many nutrients from these fruit trees, researchers have observed the predatory nature of these wasps on Z. indianus. When S. cyanea detect the fruit fly larvae, they soften, remove, and transport them back to the colony. For this reason, many fruit farmers consider S. cyanea a prospective candidate for use in pest management.
