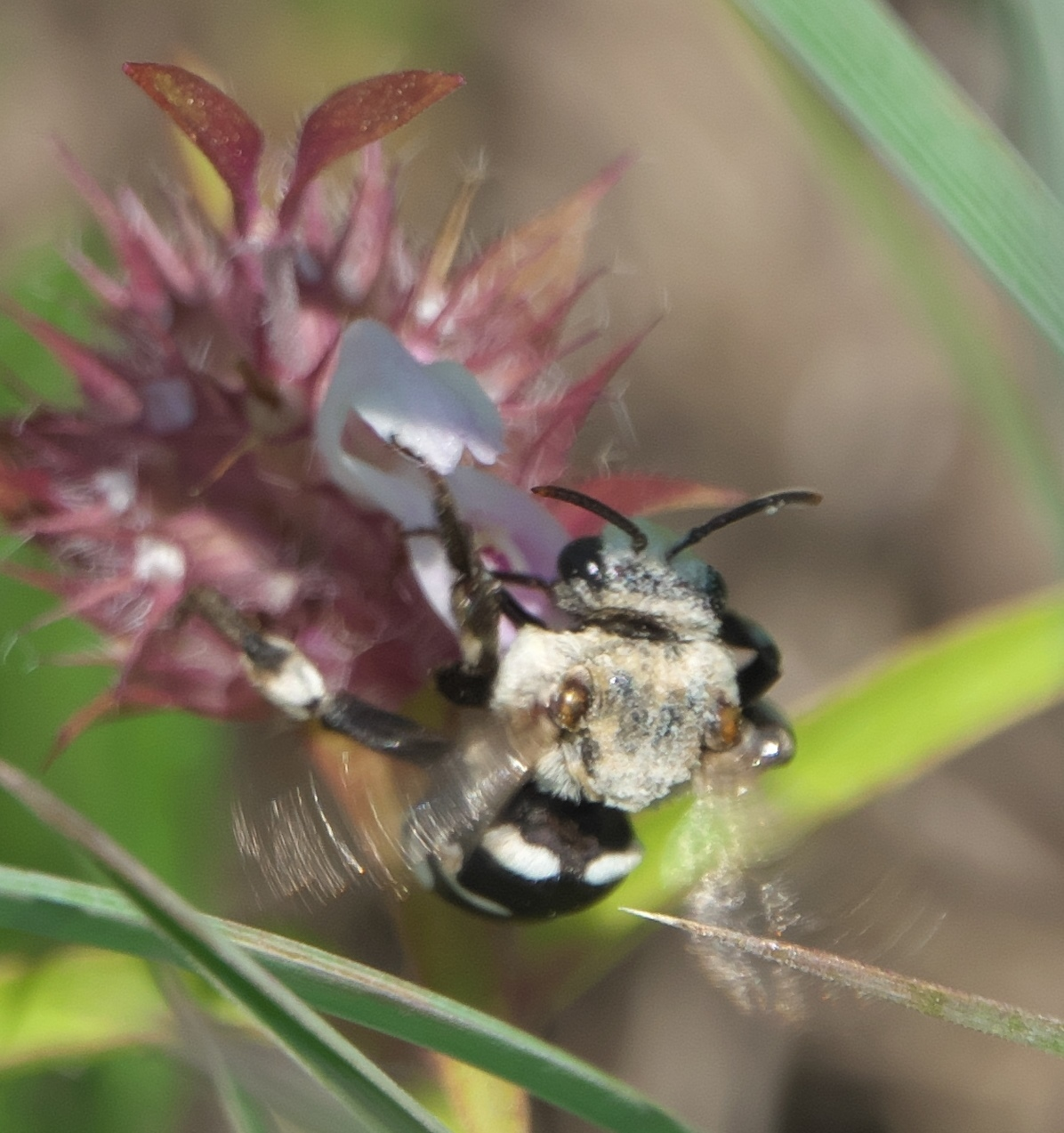
- Ericrocis lata, Oklahoma

Scientific classification
- Domain: Eukaryota
- Kingdom: Animalia
- Phylum: Arthropoda
- Class: Insecta
- Order: Hymenoptera
- Family: Apidae
- Genus: Ericrocis
- Species: E. lata

Binomial name
- Ericrocis lata (Cresson, 1878)

= Ericrocis lata =

Species of bee

Ericrocis lata is a species of bee in the family Apidae. It is found in Central America and North America.
