= Starr sting pain scale =

Pain scale for insect stings

- Purpose: compare the overall pain of hymenopteran stings

The Starr sting pain scale was created by the entomologist Christopher Starr as a scale to compare the overall pain of hymenopteran stings on a four-point scale, an expansion of the "pain index" originally created by Justin Schmidt. 1 is the lowest pain rating; 4 is the highest.

== Scale ==
Rating	Insects
1.0	Southern fire ant (Solenopsis xyloni), Red imported fire ant (Solenopsis invicta)
1.5	Western cicada killer (Sphecius grandis)
2.0	Honeybee, Africanized bee, Bumblebees, Yellowjackets
3.0	Velvet ants,, Paper wasps, Florida harvester ant (Pogonomyrmex badius)
4.0	Tarantula hawk (Pepsis grossa), Bullet ant (Paraponera clavata), Warrior wasp (Synoeca septentrionalis)

== See also ==
- Dol scale to measure pain
- Irukandji syndrome, a jellyfish sting-induced condition
- Pain scale
- Scoville scale to measure the hotness of a chili pepper
