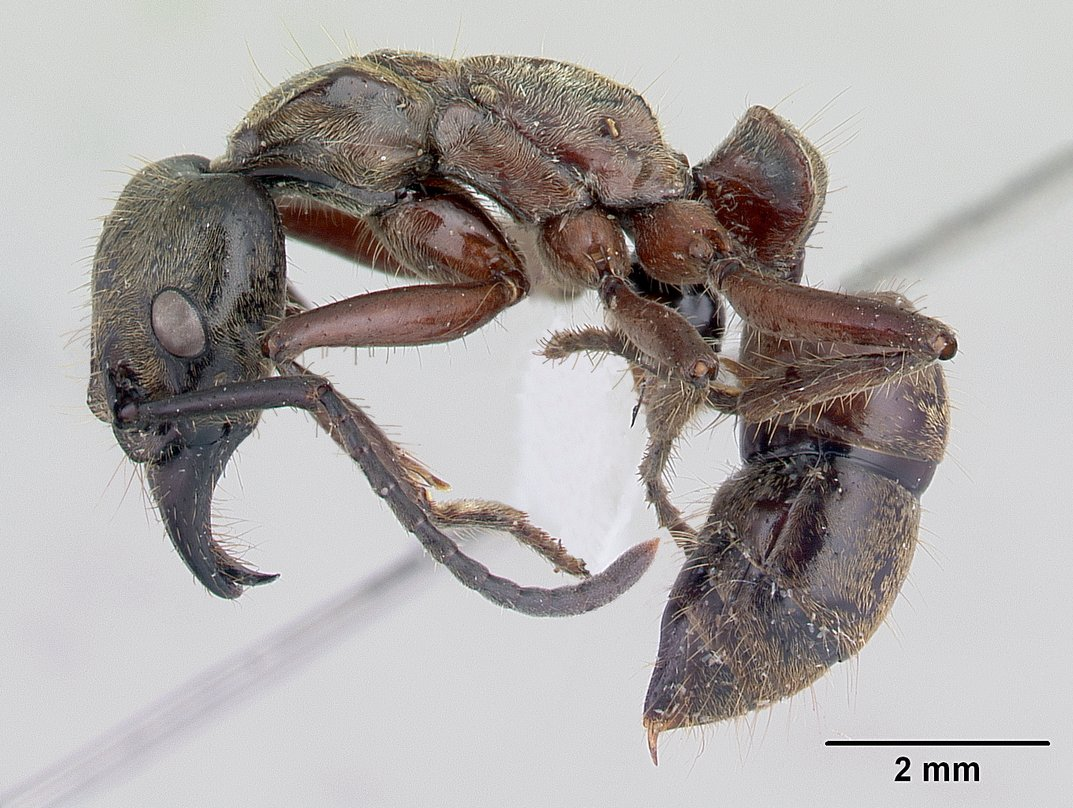
- Neoponera villosa worker

Scientific classification
- Kingdom: Animalia
- Phylum: Arthropoda
- Clade: Pancrustacea
- Class: Insecta
- Order: Hymenoptera
- Family: Formicidae
- Subfamily: Ponerinae
- Tribe: Ponerini
- Alliance: Pachycondyla genus group
- Genus: Neoponera; Emery, 1901

Type species
- Formica villosa Fabricius, 1804

Diversity
- 57 species

Synonyms
- Eumecopone Forel, 1901; Syntermitopone Wheeler, W.M., 1936; Termitopone Wheeler, W.M., 1936

= Neoponera =

Genus of ants

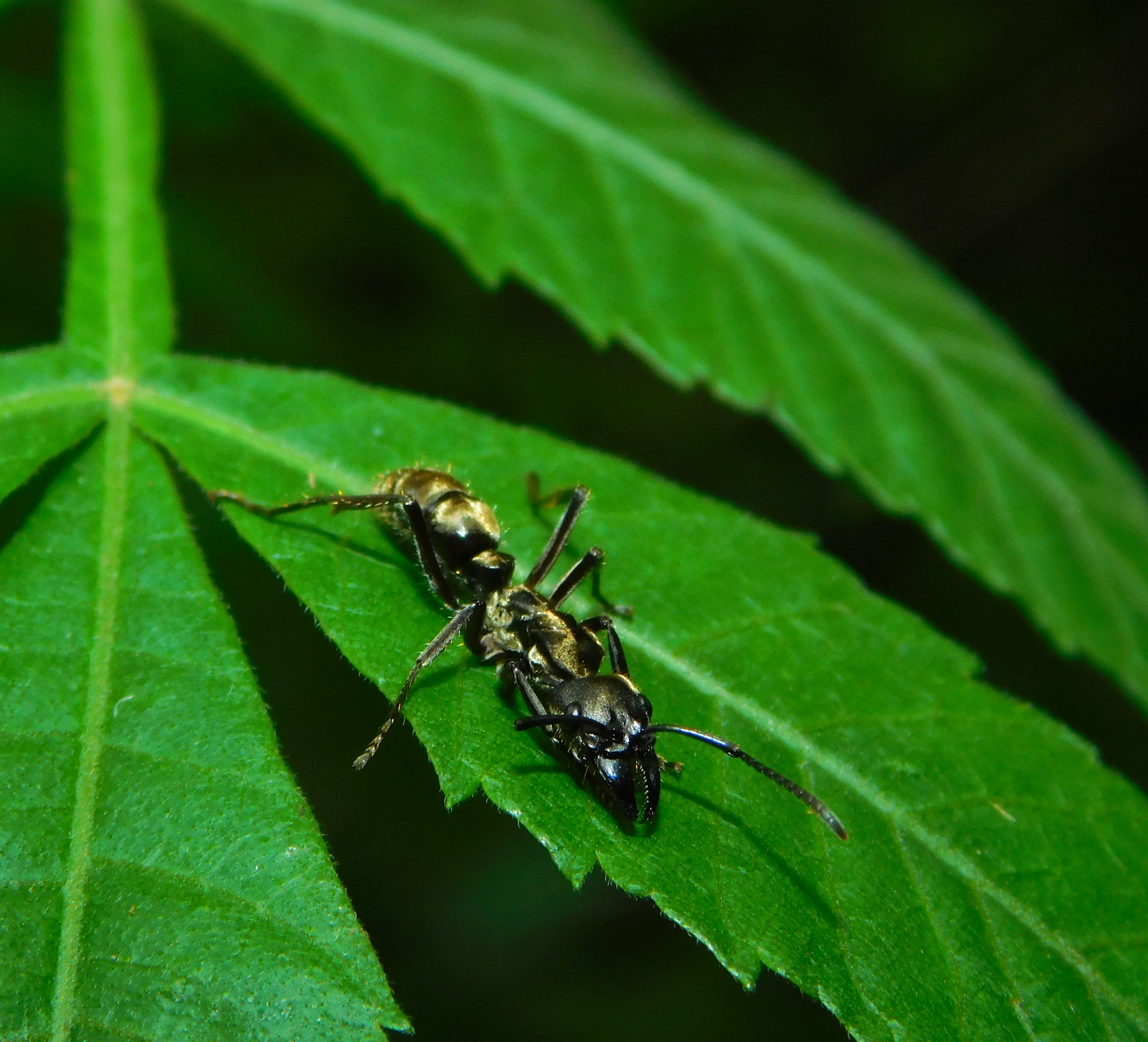

Neoponera is a genus of ants in the subfamily Ponerinae. Restricted to the Neotropics, the genus is found from southern Texas (United States) to southern Brazil. Workers are slender, and medium to large in size (6.5–19 mm); queens are similar to workers but larger and winged.

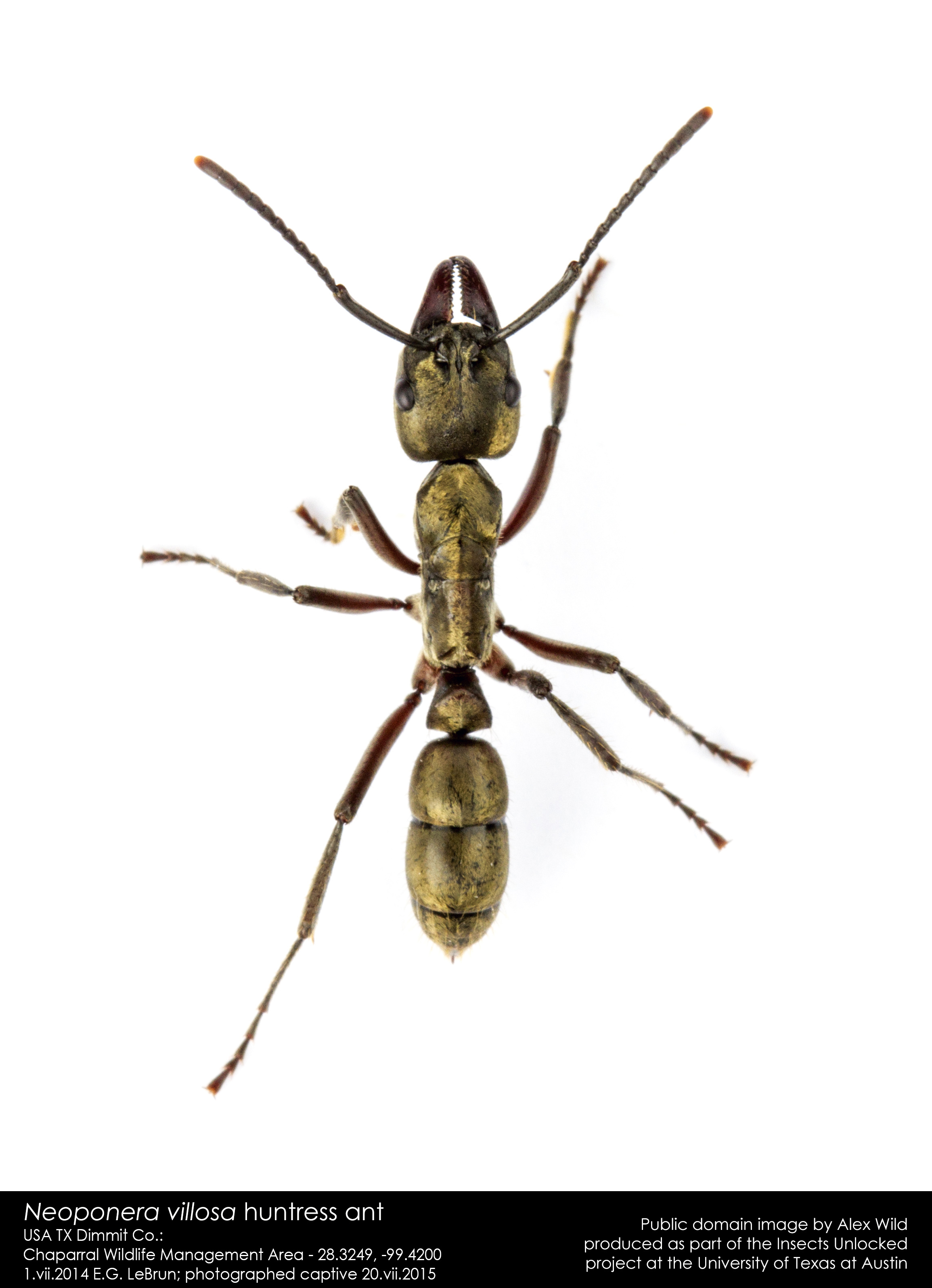
Neoponera villosa

== Species ==
- Neoponera aenescens (Mayr, 1870)
- Neoponera agilis Forel, 1901
- Neoponera antecurvata (MacKay & MacKay, 2010)
- Neoponera apicalis (Latreille, 1802)
- Neoponera bactronica (Fernandes, Oliveira & Delabie, 2014)
- Neoponera billemma (Fernandes, Oliveira & Delabie, 2014)
- Neoponera bucki (Borgmeier, 1927)
- Neoponera bugabensis (Forel, 1899)
- Neoponera carbonaria (Smith, 1858)
- Neoponera carinulata (Roger, 1861)
- Neoponera cavinodis Mann, 1916
- Neoponera chyzeri (Forel, 1907)
- Neoponera commutata (Roger, 1860)
- Neoponera concava (MacKay & MacKay, 2010)
- Neoponera cooki (MacKay & MacKay, 2010)
- Neoponera coveri (MacKay & MacKay, 2010)
- Neoponera crenata (Roger, 1861)
- Neoponera curvinodis (Forel, 1899)
- Neoponera dismarginata (MacKay & MacKay, 2010)
- Neoponera donosoi (MacKay & MacKay, 2010)
- Neoponera eleonorae (Forel, 1921)
- Neoponera emiliae Forel, 1901
- Neoponera fauveli (Emery, 1895)
- Neoponera fiebrigi Forel, 1912
- Neoponera fisheri (MacKay & MacKay, 2010)
- Neoponera foetida (Linnaeus, 1758)
- Neoponera fusca (MacKay & MacKay, 2010)
- Neoponera globularia (MacKay & MacKay, 2010)
- Neoponera golbachi Kusnezov, 1969
- Neoponera hispida (MacKay & MacKay, 2010)
- Neoponera holcotyle (MacKay & MacKay, 2010)
- Neoponera insignis (MacKay & MacKay, 2010)
- Neoponera inversa (Smith, 1858)
- Neoponera laevigata (Smith, 1858)
- Neoponera latinoda (MacKay & MacKay, 2010)
- Neoponera lineaticeps (Mayr, 1866)
- Neoponera luteola (Roger, 1861)
- Neoponera magnifica (Borgmeier, 1929)
- Neoponera marginata (Roger, 1861)
- Neoponera metanotalis (Luederwaldt, 1918)
- Neoponera moesta (Mayr, 1870)
- Neoponera oberthueri (Emery, 1890)
- Neoponera obscuricornis (Emery, 1890)
- Neoponera recava (MacKay & MacKay, 2010)
- Neoponera rostrata (Emery, 1890)
- Neoponera rugosula Emery, 1902
- Neoponera schoedli (MacKay & MacKay, 2006)
- Neoponera schultzi (MacKay & MacKay, 2010)
- Neoponera solisi (MacKay & MacKay, 2010)
- Neoponera striatinodis (Emery, 1890)
- Neoponera theresiae (Forel, 1899)
- Neoponera unidentata (Mayr, 1862)
- Neoponera venusta Forel, 1912
- Neoponera verenae Forel, 1922
- Neoponera villosa (Fabricius, 1804)
- Neoponera zuparkoi (MacKay & MacKay, 2010)
