= Synoeca chalibea =

Scientific classification
- Domain: Eukaryota
- Kingdom: Animalia
- Phylum: Arthropoda
- Class: Insecta
- Order: Hymenoptera
- Family: Vespidae
- Subfamily: Polistinae
- Tribe: Epiponini
- Genus: Synoeca
- Species: S. chalibea

Binomial name
- Synoeca chalibea Saussure, 1852

Synonyms
- Synoeca chalybea Saussure, 1854 Lapsus calami Synoeca irina var. splendens du Buysson, 1906

Species of wasp

Synoeca chalibea is a swarm-founding social wasp that ranges from Costa Rica to Brazil. The species name was originally published in 1852 as chalibea, but misspelled as chalybea in most subsequent publications.
