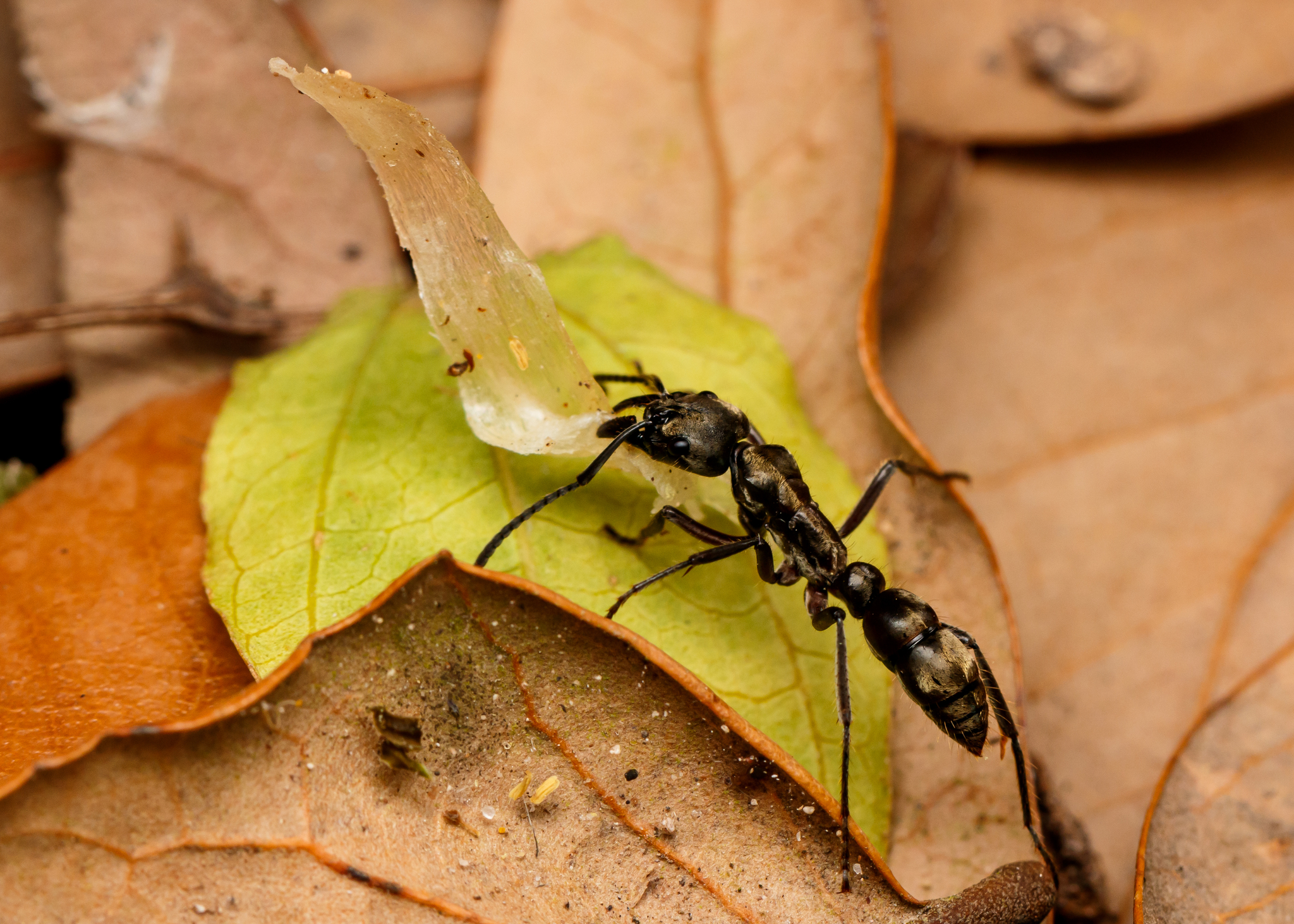
- Neoponera villosa, hairy panther ant, Texas

Scientific classification
- Kingdom: Animalia
- Phylum: Arthropoda
- Clade: Pancrustacea
- Class: Insecta
- Order: Hymenoptera
- Family: Formicidae
- Tribe: Ponerini
- Alliance: Pachycondyla genus group
- Genus: Neoponera
- Species: N. villosa

Binomial name
- Neoponera villosa (Fabricius, 1804)

= Neoponera villosa =

Species of ant

Neoponera villosa, known generally as hairy panther ant, is a species of ant in the family Formicidae. Other common names include the greater Texas bullet ant and giant hunting ant.

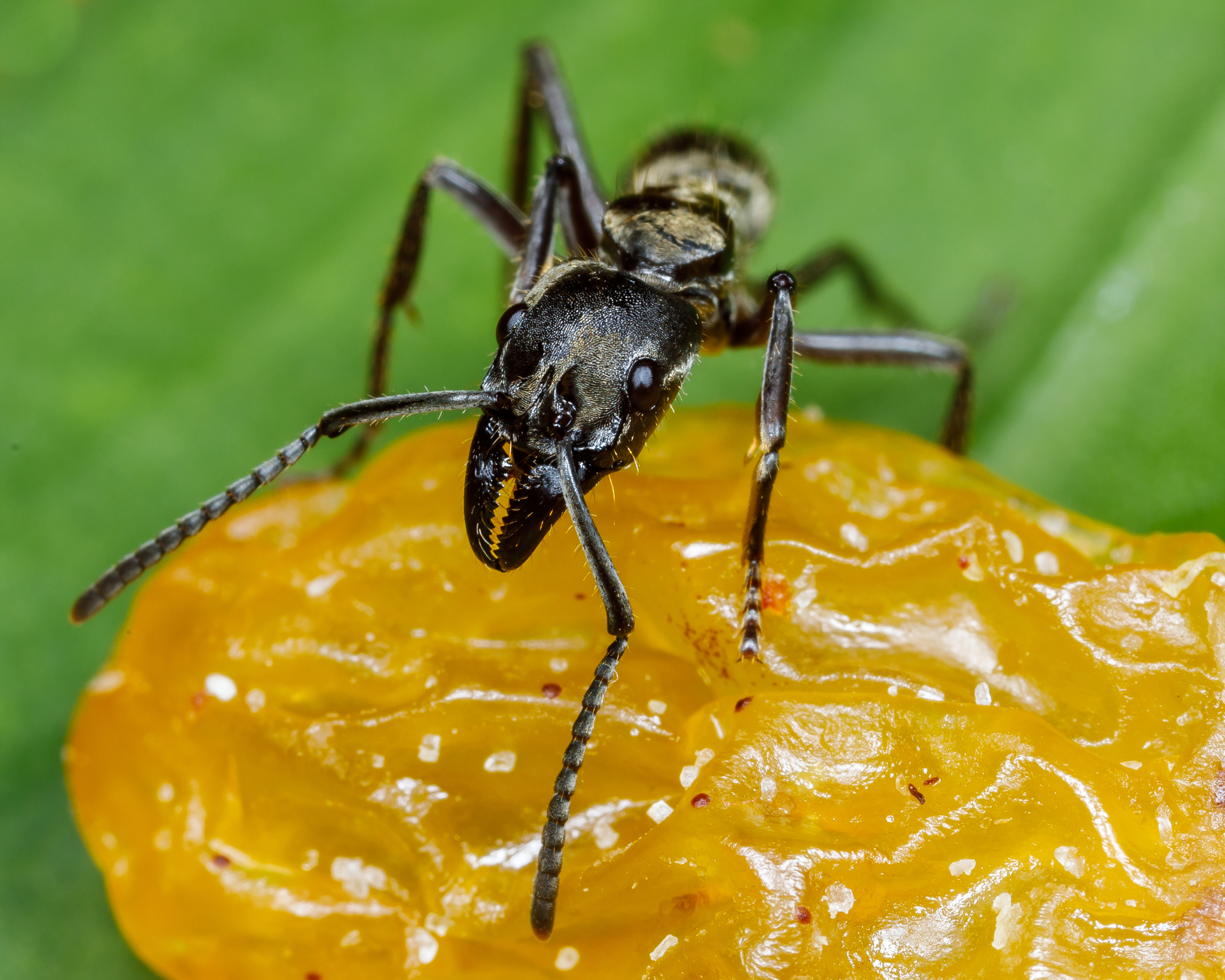
Neoponera villosa, hairy panther ant, Texas
