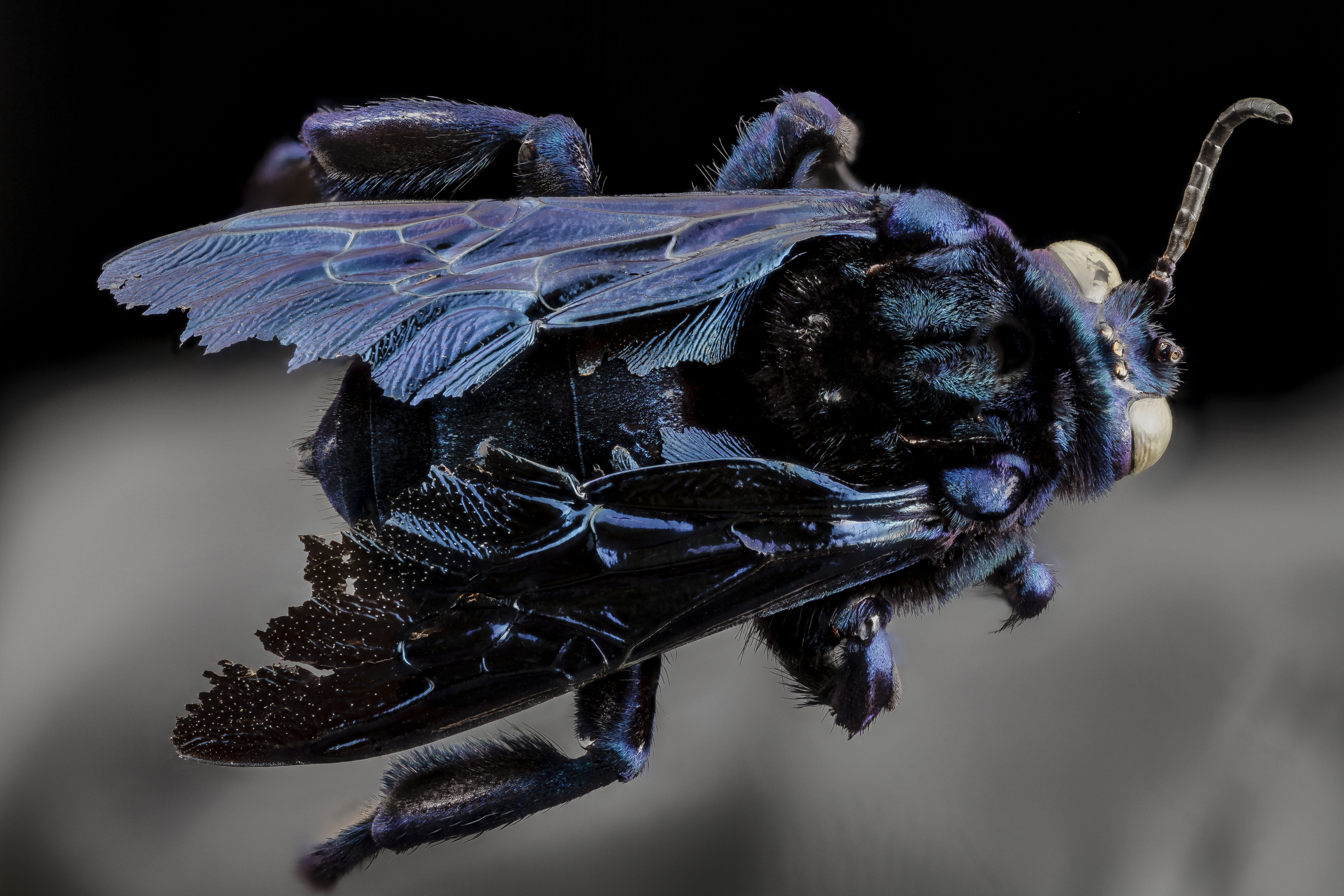
- Acanthopus excellens, female

Scientific classification
- Kingdom: Animalia
- Phylum: Arthropoda
- Clade: Pancrustacea
- Class: Insecta
- Order: Hymenoptera
- Family: Apidae
- Subfamily: Apinae
- Tribe: Ericrocidini

Genera
- see text

= Ericrocidini =

Tribe of bees

The Ericrocidini are a tribe of cuckoo bees in the family Apidae.

== Genera ==
- Acanthopus
- Aglaomelissa
- Ctenioschelus
- Epiclopus
- Ericrocis
- Hopliphora
- Mesocheira
- Mesonychium
- Mesoplia
