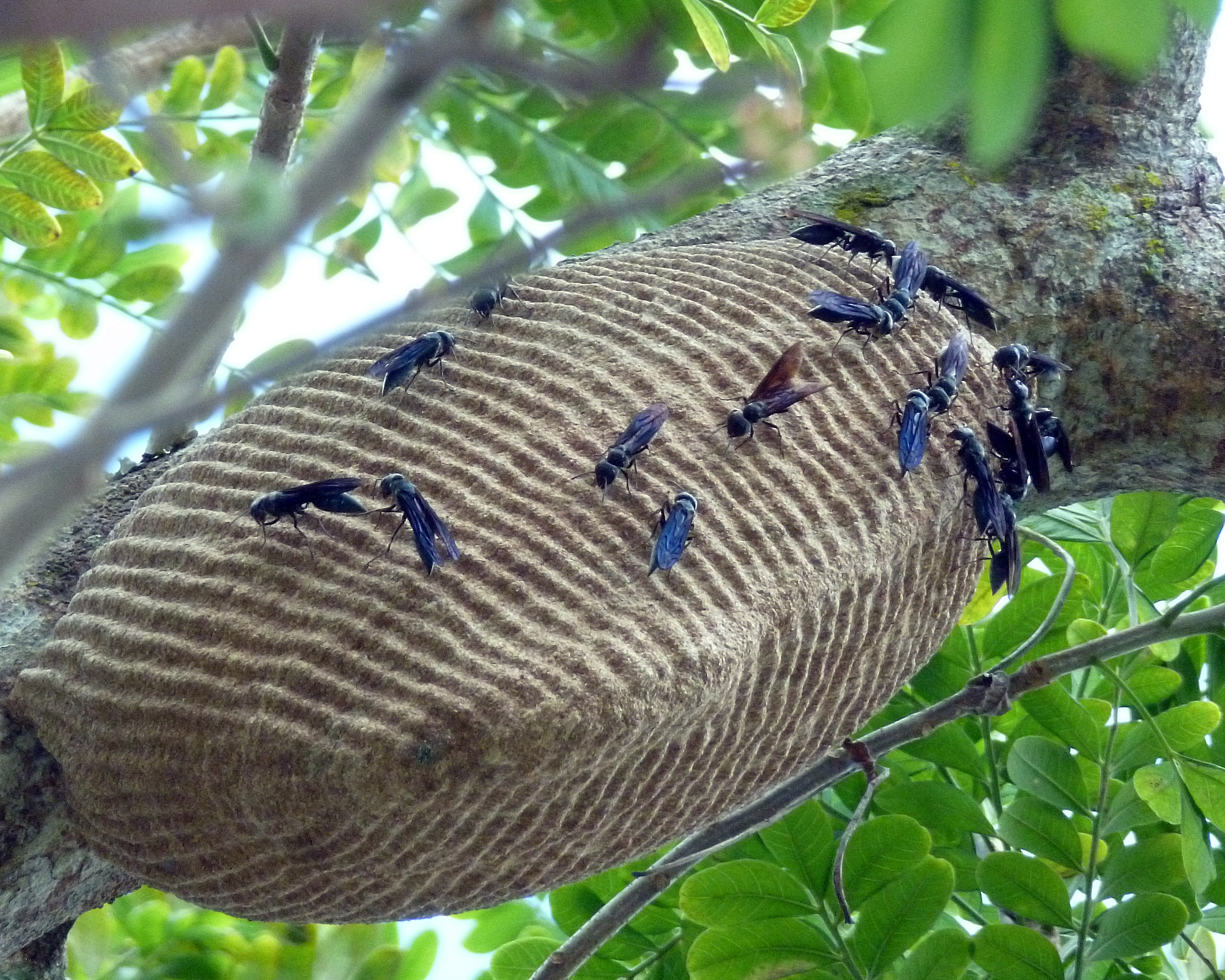
- S. surinama nest in Trinidad and Tobago

Scientific classification
- Kingdom: Animalia
- Phylum: Arthropoda
- Clade: Pancrustacea
- Class: Insecta
- Order: Hymenoptera
- Family: Vespidae
- Subfamily: Polistinae
- Tribe: Epiponini
- Genus: Synoeca
- Species: S. surinama

Binomial name
- Synoeca surinama (Linnaeus, 1767)

Synonyms
- Vespa surinama Linnaeus, 1767; Vespa nigricornis Olivier, 1792; Polistes coerulea Fabricius, 1804; Synoeca surimana Zavattari, 1906 Lapsus calami Synoeca surinamensis Vesey-Fitzgerald, 1939 Lapsus calami

= Synoeca surinama =

Species of wasp

Synoeca surinama is a Neotropical swarm-founding wasp of the tribe Epiponini. It is known for its metallic blue and black appearance and painful sting. S. surinama builds nests on tree trunks and can be found in tropical climates of South America. When preparing to swarm, there are a number of pre-swarming behaviors that members of S. surinama colonies partake in, such as buzzing runs and occasional brood cannibalism. In S. surinama, social environmental conditions determine the caste ranks of individuals in the developing brood. Unlike less primitive Hymenoptera species, S. surinama display little morphological variation between egg laying queens and workers. S. surinama wasps visit flowering plants and are considered pollinators. When these wasps sting, the stinger is left in the victim and the wasp ultimately dies.

== Taxonomy and phylogenetics ==
The genus Synoeca is small, monophyletic, and is made up of the five species S. chalibea, S. virginea, S. septentrionalis, S. surinama, and S. cyanea The sister species of S. surinama within the genus is S. cyanea.

== Description and identification ==
Front of insect head diagram

S. surinama is a medium-sized wasp that is blueish-black in color and can appear metallic in certain light. It has dark, almost black wings. Like other members of the genus Synoeca, S. surinama has several specific identifying characteristics. More specifically, the head of S. surinama has a projecting vertex. Within Synoeca, there is some variation regarding how concentrated punctation (small markings or spots) is on the first abdominal segment (propodeum). Unlike S. chalibea and S. virginea, which have dense propodeal punctation, S. surinama, S. cyanea, and S. septentrionalis have less dorsal and lateral propodeal punctation.

=== Nest identification ===
Nests of S. surinama are made from short chip material, rather than the long fibers used by some other Synoeca species. The comb has an anchored, pulp foundation, and the envelope is reinforced by blots. These nests do not have a secondary envelope, and the primary envelope is not as wide on the bottom as it is on the top. The nests also have a central dorsal ridge and a keel, rather than a groove. The entrances to S. surinama nests are formed as a separate structure away from the last gap, have a short, collar-like structure, and are centrally located toward the periphery of the envelope. Secondary combs are either absent or contiguous with the primary comb, and comb expansion occurs gradually. During nest construction, most cells are laid out before the envelope is closed.

== Distribution and habitat ==
Map of Neotropic ecozone

S. surinama is found in regions with tropical climates in South America. It is most commonly found in Venezuela, Colombia, Brazil Guyana, Suriname (from which S. surinama derives its name), French Guiana, Ecuador, Peru, and the northern parts of Bolivia. It can be found in specific habitats such as wet grassland, scattered shrub area, sparse shrubs and trees, and gallery forest. During the dry season, S. surinama nests on tree trunks in gallery forest, but it forages in all four of the aforementioned habitats because it is robust enough to fly a relatively long distance from its nest. It is one of the most common species of social wasp in Central Brazil.

== Colony cycle ==
S. surinama is a swarm-founding wasp, and during colony initiation queens and workers move together as a group to their new site. Individuals do not disperse during this time so there is no solitary phase. Comb expansion occurs gradually, and workers are responsible for constructing the cells of the nest for queens to lay eggs in. S. surinama, like all other species of social Hymenoptera, function in a society in which all workers are female. Males, which do not contribute to work for the colony, are rarely found; however, some have been observed in recently founded, pre-emergence colonies of S. surinama. It is thought that these males are brothers of the founding females.

== Behavior ==
=== Swarming behavior ===
S. surinama, like many other related wasp species, exhibit swarming behavior. This is a collective behavior in which certain events or stimuli cause many individuals of the same species (most commonly from the same colony) to fly in close aggregation with one another, often appearing to onlookers as a giant cloud of moving insects.

==== Reasons to swarm ====
Colonies of S. surinama often swarm after the nest has experienced some sort of threat or attack, such as an affront by a predator that is severe enough to cause nest damage. Newly founded colonies of S. surinama have also been known to swarm after a bright light was directed at the comb, perhaps falsely simulating nest damage and exposure to sunlight.

==== Pre-swarming behavior ====
Once an event worthy to cause a swarm has occurred, S. surinama exhibit synchronous alarm behavior such as buzzing runs and loop flights, which more individuals continue to participate in until building activity comes to a halt. Not all stimuli cause the same response, however, since brood composition affects a colony’s readiness to swarm. Colonies that have an empty nest or a very immature brood that would require a lot of resources to rear may be more ready to immediately swarm in response to danger than a colony with a large brood that is close to maturity. This is because staying to nurture this more developed brood for a short time might have a huge reproductive payoff in the form of many new workers.

===== Buzzing runs =====
A sure sign of alarm in S. surinama is called "buzzing runs", which refers to a pre-swarming behavior triggered by a specific event. Most of the workers do not participate in this behavior, but the 8-10% of those who do are generally older members of the colony. When S. surinama perform buzzing runs, individuals are likely to have their mandibles raised and their antennae motionless, while also shaking from side to side and contacting other colony members with their mouthparts. Buzzing runs are irregular in rhythm and increase in intensity until the swarm departs. It has been suggested that buzzing runs function also to increase alertness and readiness to fly in the rest of the colony because they are similar to other known alarm behaviors; also, when a colony has members that are performing buzzing runs, small interferences with the nest that would not usually warrant any reaction cause many individuals to immediately fly away from the nest.

===== Brood cannibalism =====
Although during pre-swarming activities S. surinama continue to forage, some older workers (over 21 days old) may eat large larvae and pupae before deserting the nest. This behavior is commonly referred to as brood cannibalism or filial cannibalism. When this situation arises, eggs and small larvae are left untouched. Young workers (1–21 days old) do not participate in eating larvae, so there is no competition between old and young workers for this food source.

==== Swarm movement and relocation ====
When S. surinama wasps swarm, several things must take place: first, some individuals must plan ahead and find a suitable location for the swarm to move to; second, those who have found the next location must inform others how to get there by leaving a scent trail; and third, the colony members must follow the trail in order to arrive at the new location.

===== Scent trails =====
Although wasps do not generally leave scent trails when the swarm is moving less than twenty meters away from the original location, most swarms do move farther, so scent trails are utilized. Scent trails are marked by scouts, who have a special gland called the Richards’ gland that releases an odor which other wasps can recognize and follow. When scouts release these olfactory cues, they perform a behavior called dragging, which refers to the action of laying down the scented chemicals. Another species that shows this behavior is Polybia sericea.

===== Trail following =====
S. surinama wasps individually follow the scent trail laid out by workers to their new nesting site, rather than in a group. Trail following may appear similar to foraging because in order to accurately follow the trail the wasp must stop and investigate different landmarks to ensure that the scent left by the scout is still present. Generally, scented stopping points along the route are spaced roughly two to ten meters apart, and appear on obvious landmarks in the trail such as fence posts or rock surfaces. When the trail comes to a turn, marked sites are spaced much closer to one another to make it easier for the wasp to follow the trail.

=== Dominance hierarchy ===
In S. surinama, social environmental conditions determine the caste ranks of individuals in the developing brood. Ritualistic dominance behaviors decide who the queen will be and potential queens face off in aggressive displays that may involve abdomen-bending gestures. Individuals that back down submissively are demoted to worker status, whereas those who act most aggressively towards her sisters becomes queen. These displays are relatively mild compared to the competition that may occur between potential queens of other species of wasps, and after the queen is decided upon, she is not as dominant as the queen of other more primitive vespidae species.

==== Lack of reproductive suppression ====
In S. surinama, workers who do not lay eggs are virtually identical to queens that do; however, egglayers are the only caste that experiences ovarian development. Despite the fact that egglayers have enhanced ovary development, they do not increase in size and morphometric differences are minimally, if at all, present.

== Human Importance ==
=== Agriculture as pollinator ===
S. surinama functions as a pollinator, and is able to carry pollen on its legs and head. It has been known to visit flowers of the Bauhinia guianensis, which contain nectar, so it is likely that these wasps consume nectar as a carbohydrate energy source. S. surinama is most likely to visit these flowers in the morning and afternoon.

=== Sting autotomy ===
S. surinama wasps have barbed stingers, which is a significant characteristic for both the wasp producing the sting and the organism being stung. S. surinama are one of the highly social Hymenoptera species to employ sting autonomy (also called autotomy) as a mechanism of colony defense. The stingers of S. surinama have lancet barbs, which when injected into flesh will not come out easily. This act is suicidal for the individual performing it, but can function as great protection for the rest of the colony; in addition to continuing to inject venom, the sting apparatus also releases alarm pheromones and thereby marks the target as a recognised threat to be dealt with immediately if it should return. This defense is most effective against vertebrates, and is in fact disadvantageous against raiding insects. Generally, S. surinama only sting for defense, not offense.

=== Sting venom ===
2-D chemical structure of the neurotransmitter serotonin

One of the active chemicals that are injected into the victim of a S. surinama sting is 5-hydroxytryptamine, which is commonly known as the neurotransmitter serotonin. When injected, serotonin acts as a vasoconstrictor, which could potentially be lethal to small animals. Since vasoconstrictor chemicals are often released in response to an open wound in order to stop excessive bleeding, the elevated presence of this vasoconstrictor falsely signals to the brain that there is a serious wound in the periphery, and this is experienced as severe pain. In S. surinama, serotonin has also been found in the head, though in smaller amounts than what is found in the stinging apparatus.
