= Justin O. Schmidt =

American entomologist (1947–2023)

- Born: Justin Orvel Schmidt; March 23, 1947; Rhinelander, Wisconsin, U.S.
- Died: February 18, 2023 (aged 75); Tucson, Arizona, U.S.
- Education: Pennsylvania State University (BS); University of British Columbia (MS); University of Georgia (PhD)
- Occupation: Entomologist
- Notable work: Schmidt sting pain index
- Awards: Ig Nobel Prize (2015)
- Scientific career
- Thesis: Defensive strategies of wasps and ants: Dasymutilla occidentalis and Pogonomyrmex badius (1977)
- Doctoral advisor: Murray S. Blum

Justin Orvel Schmidt (March 23, 1947 – February 18, 2023) was an American entomologist, co-author of Insect Defenses: Adaptive Mechanisms and Strategies of Prey and Predators, author of The Sting of the Wild, and creator of the Schmidt sting pain index. Schmidt studied honey bee nutrition, chemical communication, physiology, ecology, and behavior at the Carl Hayden Bee Research Center in Tucson, Arizona, before taking lead and devoting full-time to The Southwestern Biological Institute in 2006. As research director of the Southwest Biological Institute, he studied the chemical and behavioral defenses of ants, wasps, and arachnids.

Schmidt shared a 2015 Ig Nobel Prize in Physiology and Entomology for the development of the Schmidt sting pain index. His work was highlighted by major media outlets around the world on shows such as “72 Dangerous Animals Latin America”.

Schmidt died in Tucson, Arizona, of complications of Parkinson's disease on February 18, 2023, at the age of 75.

== See also ==
- Apiology
