= List of Mutillidae genera =

Family of velvet ants

These 121 genera belong to the family Mutillidae, velvet ants.

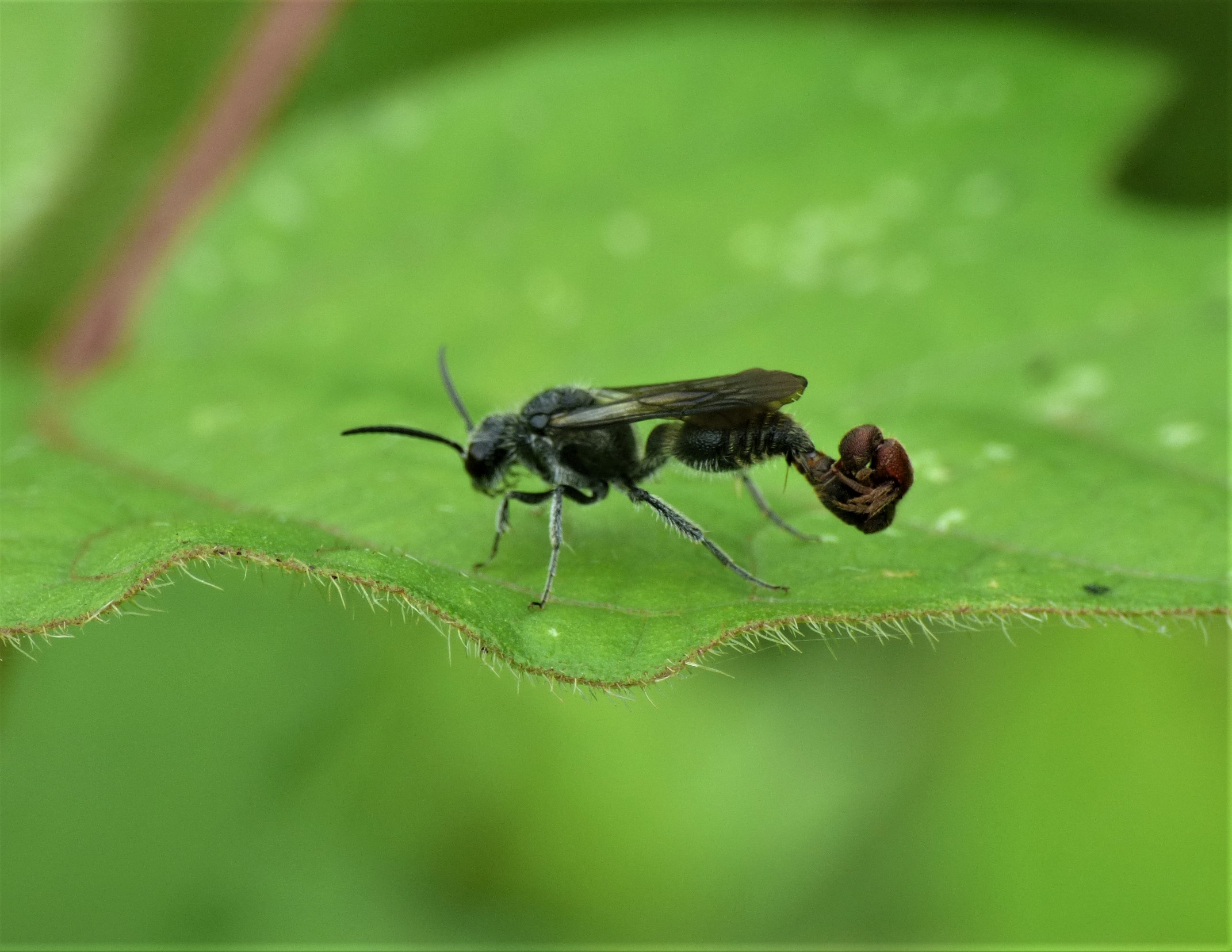
Pherotilla sp. from Udaipur, India

== Mutillidae genera ==
- Acanthophotopsis Schuster, 1958^{g}
- Acrophotopsis Schuster, 1958^{g b}
- Allotilla Schuster, 1949^{g}
- Ancipitotilla Mickel, 1952^{g}
- Ancistrotilla Brothers, 2012^{g}
- Andreimyrme Lelej, 1995^{g}
- Arcuatotilla Nonveiller, 1998^{g}
- Arnoldtilla Nonveiller, 1996^{g}
- Artiotilla Invrea, 1950^{g}
- Ascetotilla Brothers, 1971^{g}
- Bidecoloratilla Turrisi & Matteini Palmerini^{g}
- Bimaculatilla Turrisi & Matteini Palmerini^{g}
- Bischoffiella Brothers & Nonveillier, 2015^{g}
- Bischoffitilla Lelej, 2002^{g}
- Blakeius Ashmead, 1903^{g}
- Brahmatilla Lelej, 2005^{g}
- Ceratophotopsis Schuster, 1949^{g}
- Chaetotilla Schuster, 1949^{g}
- Chrestomutilla Brothers, 1971^{g}
- Cretavus Sharov, 1957^{g}
- Ctenotilla Bischoff, 1920^{g}
- Cystomutilla André, 1896^{g}
- Darditilla Casal, 1965^{g}
- Dasylabris Radoszkowski, 1885^{g}
- Dasymutilla Ashmead, 1899^{i c g b}
- Dentilla Lelej, 1980^{g}
- Dentotilla ^{g}
- Dilophotopsis Schuster, 1958^{g b}
- Dolichomutilla Ashmead, 1899^{g}
- Eotilla Schuster, 1949^{g}
- Ephucilla Lelej, 1995^{g}
- Ephusuarezia Casal, 1968^{g}
- Ephuta Say, 1836^{b}
- Ephutomma Ashmead, 1899^{g}
- Ephutomorpha André, 1902^{c g}
- Euspinolia Ashmead, 1903^{g}
- Frigitilla ^{g}
- Gystomutilla ^{g}
- Hemutilla Lelej, Tu & Chen^{g}
- Hoplocrates Mickel, 1937^{g}
- Hoplognathoca Suárez, 1962^{g}
- Hoplomutilla Ashmead, 1899^{g}
- Horcomutilla Casal, 1962^{g}
- Karlissaidia Lelej, 2005^{g}
- Karunaratnea Lelej, 2005^{g}
- Krombeinella Pate, 1947^{g}
- Kudakrumia Krombein, 1979^{g}
- Kurzenkotilla Lelej, 2005^{g}
- Labidomilla André, 1902^{g}
- Laminatilla Pitts, 2007^{g}
- Lehritilla Lelej, 2005^{g}
- Leucospilomutilla Ashmead, 1903^{g}
- Liomutilla André, 1907^{g}
- Lomachaeta Mickel, 1936^{g b}
- Lophomutilla Mickel, 1952^{g}
- Lophostigma Mickel, 1952^{g}
- Lynchiatilla Casal, 1963^{g}
- Macromyrme Lelej, 1984^{g}
- Mickelomyrme Lelej, 1995^{g}
- Mimecomutilla Ashmead, 1903^{g}
- Myrmilla Wesmael, 1852^{g}
- Myrmilloides ^{b}
- Myrmosa Latreille, 1796^{g}
- Nanomutilla Andre, 1900^{g}
- Nanotopsis Schuster, 1949^{g}
- Nemka Lelej, 1985^{g}
- Neotrogaspidia Lelej, 1996^{g}
- Odontomutilla Ashmead, 1899^{g}
- Odontophotopsis Viereck, 1903^{g b}
- Orientidia Lelej, 1996^{g}
- Orientilla Lelej, 1979^{g}
- Paglianotilla Lelejan Harten, 2006^{g}
- Pappognatha Mickel, 1939^{g}
- Paramyrmosa de Saussure, 1880^{g}
- Pertyella Mickel, 1952^{g}
- Petersenidia Lelej, 1992^{g}
- Pherotilla Brothers, 2015^{g}
- Photomorphus (Photomorphina) archboldi Manley & Deyrup, 1987^{g b}
- Photopsis Blake, 1886^{g}
- Physetopoda Schuster, 1949^{g}
- Platymyrmilla Andre, 1900^{g}
- Promecidia Lelej, 1996^{g}
- Promecilla André, 1902^{g}
- Protomutilla Bischoff, 1916^{g}
- Protophotopsis Schuster, 1947^{g b}
- Prototilla Schuster, 1949^{g}
- Pseudomethoca Ashmead, 1896^{g b}
- Pseudomyrmosa Suárez, 1980^{g}
- Pseudophotopsis Andre, 1896^{g}
- Radoszkowskitilla Lelej, 2005^{g}
- Radoszkowskius Ashmead, 1903^{g}
- Rasnitsynitilla Lelejan Harten, 2006^{g}
- Rimulotilla Brothers, 2015^{g}
- Ronisia Costa, 1858^{g}
- Schusterphotopsis Pitts, 2003^{g}
- Seriatospidia Nonveiller & Ćetković, 1996^{g}
- Sigilla Skorikov, 1927^{g}
- Sinotilla Lelej, 1995^{g}
- Skorikovia Ovtchinnikov, 2002^{g}
- Smicromutilla Mickel, 1964^{g}
- Smicromyrme Thomson, 1870^{g}
- Smicromyrmilla Suárez, 1965^{g}
- Sphaerophthalma Blake, 1886^{g}
- Sphaeropthalma Blake, 1871^{g b}
- Spinulomutilla Nonveiller, 1994^{g}
- Squamulotilla Bischoff, 1920^{g}
- Standfussidia Lelej, 2005^{g}
- Stenomutilla André, 1896^{g}
- Storozhenkotilla Lelej, 2005^{g}
- Taimyrmosa Lelej, 2005^{g}
- Taiwanomyrme Tsuneki, 1993^{g}
- Tallium André, 1902^{g}
- Timulla Ashmead, 1899^{g b}
- Tobantilla Casal, 1965^{g}
- Traumatomutilla André, 1901^{g}
- Tricholabiodes Radoszkowski, 1885^{g}
- Trogaspidia Ashmead, 1899^{g}
- Tropidotilla Bischoff, 1920^{g}
- Typhoctes Ashmead, 1899^{g}
- Vanhartenidia Lelejan Harten, 2006^{g}
- Zavatilla Tsuneki, 1993^{g}
- Zeugomutilla Chen, 1957^{g}

Data sources: i = ITIS, c = Catalogue of Life, g = GBIF, b = Bugguide.net
