= Timulla atriceps =

Scientific classification
- Domain: Eukaryota
- Kingdom: Animalia
- Phylum: Arthropoda
- Class: Insecta
- Order: Hymenoptera
- Family: Mutillidae
- Genus: Timulla
- Species: T. atriceps

Binomial name
- Timulla atriceps (Smith, 1855)

Species of velvest ants

Timulla atriceps is a species of velvet ant of the genus Timulla. It occurs in South America, in the north of Brazil.
