= Ephutomorpha ruficornis =

Scientific classification
- Domain: Eukaryota
- Kingdom: Animalia
- Phylum: Arthropoda
- Class: Insecta
- Order: Hymenoptera
- Family: Mutillidae
- Genus: Ephutomorpha
- Species: E. ruficornis

Binomial name
- Ephutomorpha ruficornis (Fabricius, 1775)

Synonyms
- Mutilla ruficornis Fabricius, 1775

Species of wasp

Ephutomorpha ruficornis is a species of parasitoid wasp in the family Mutillidae endemic to Australia.

== Defenses ==
Ephutomorpha ruficornis is believed to use Müllerian mimicry by mimicking the colorations of Fabriogenia species.
