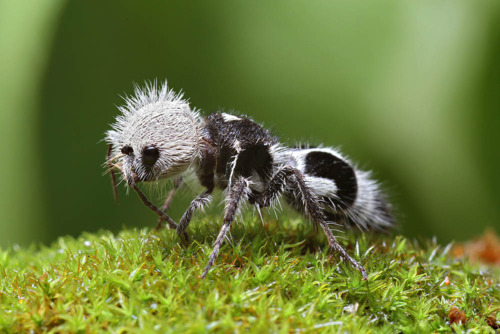

Scientific classification
- Kingdom: Animalia
- Phylum: Arthropoda
- Clade: Pancrustacea
- Class: Insecta
- Order: Hymenoptera
- Family: Mutillidae
- Genus: Euspinolia
- Species: E. militaris

Binomial name
- Euspinolia militaris Mickel, 1938

= Euspinolia militaris =

Species of wasp

Euspinolia militaris is a species of velvet ant in the family Mutillidae, a group of wasps. Despite its common name “panda ant”, it is not a true ant.

== Description ==
The species was described in 1938 and is endemic to Chile, where it inhabits sclerophyll forests. It is commonly known as the "panda ant" due to its distinctive black-and-white coloration, with dense white setae covering most of the head except the eyes, and contrasting dark markings on the body. The coloration is aposematic, serving as a warning to potential predators of its defensive sting. Females are wingless, while males possess wings. Adults measure up to eight millimetres (0.31 in) in length.

== Biology ==
Euspinolia militaris is a solitary parasitoid of mature larvae or pre-pupae of other insects, as is typical of mutillids, with females using the ovipositor both to insert eggs into host brood cells and for defense. Like other mutillids, males are presumed to lift females during mating and copulate while airborne. After mating, the female enters an underground bee or wasp nest where she lays an egg, and the mutillid larva feeds on the host larva and eventually kills it.

=== Stridulation ===
The species produces sound in response to threats from potential predators via stridulation, as do other mutillids, though this species is unusual in having a strong ultrasonic component to the sounds it produces. Compared to other mutillids studied, the distress stridulation emitted by E. militaris has a larger number of pulses and a longer duration in the forward notes. Additionally, its chirp durations and repetition intervals are longer and emitted at lower rates.
