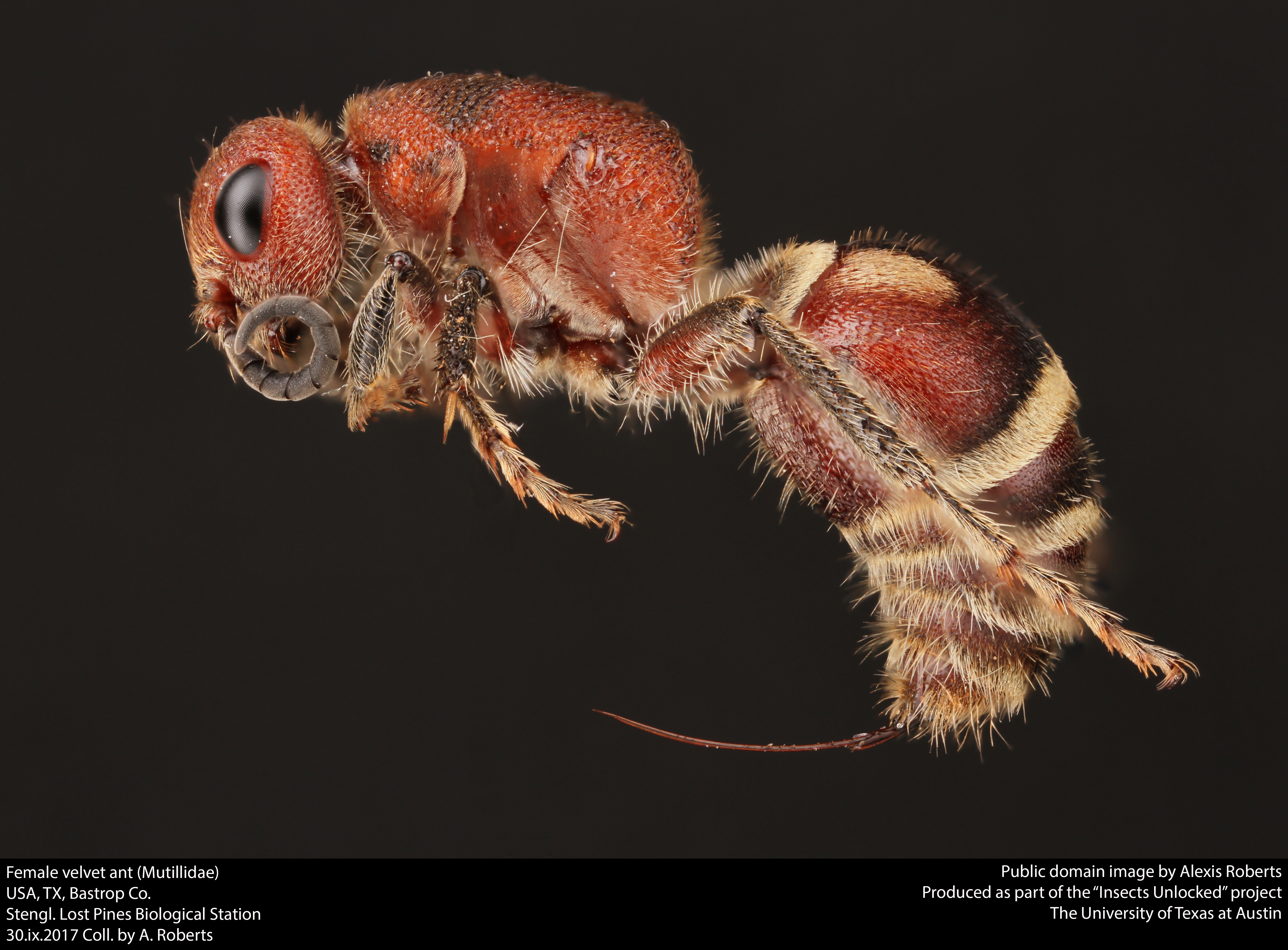
- Female holotype of T. ferrugata, in USA

Scientific classification
- Kingdom: Animalia
- Phylum: Arthropoda
- Class: Insecta
- Order: Hymenoptera
- Family: Mutillidae
- Genus: Timulla
- Species: T. ferrugata

Binomial name
- Timulla ferrugata (Fabricius, 1805)

= Timulla ferrugata =

Species of velvet ants

Timulla ferrugata is a species of velvet ant, of the Timulla genus, the species lives in the southeastern United States. The species has an orange color on almost all of its body, the beak and rear are brown and dark orange.

== Size ==
The species measures 5 to 10 mm of length. The female is larger than the male.

== Alimentation ==
The species eat fruits, insects, and small nammals. It is a social species, which walks in large groups of up to 100 individuals or more.
