= Dk5a =

Wasp toxin

Identifiers
3D model (JSmol)	Interactive image
- InChI: InChI=1S/C146H251N39O36S/c1-22-82(14)116(178-111(189)76-158-110(188)75-159-123(198)102(73-89-42-26-25-27-43-89)173-122(197)90(152)44-38-65-157-146(155)156)139(214)175-100(70-77(4)5)133(208)167-94(48-31-36-63-150)131(206)182-118(84(16)24-3)141(216)176-101(71-78(6)7)132(207)166-92(46-29-34-61-148)126(201)165-93(47-30-35-62-149)129(204)180-115(81(12)13)138(213)177-104(72-79(8)9)143(218)183-66-39-50-105(183)135(210)169-91(45-28-33-60-147)124(199)161-87(19)121(196)181-117(83(15)23-2)140(215)171-95(49-32-37-64-151)130(205)179-114(80(10)11)137(212)162-85(17)119(194)160-86(18)120(195)164-97(54-57-112(190)191)127(202)168-98(59-69-222-21)125(200)163-88(20)142(217)185-68-41-52-107(185)144(219)184-67-40-51-106(184)136(211)170-96(53-56-108(153)186)128(203)174-103(74-109(154)187)134(209)172-99(145(220)221)55-58-113(192)193/h25-27,42-43,77-88,90-107,114-118H,22-24,28-41,44-76,147-152H2,1-21H3,(H2,153,186)(H2,154,187)(H,158,188)(H,159,198)(H,160,194)(H,161,199)(H,162,212)(H,163,200)(H,164,195)(H,165,201)(H,166,207)(H,167,208)(H,168,202)(H,169,210)(H,170,211)(H,171,215)(H,172,209)(H,173,197)(H,174,203)(H,175,214)(H,176,216)(H,177,213)(H,178,189)(H,179,205)(H,180,204)(H,181,196)(H,182,206)(H,190,191)(H,192,193)(H,220,221)(H4,155,156,157)/t82-,83-,84-,85-,86-,87-,88-,90-,91-,92-,93-,94-,95-,96-,97-,98-,99-,100-,101-,102-,103-,104-,105-,106-,107-,114-,115-,116-,117-,118-/m0/s1 Key: VJVPTAUWLJFARD-FYVVXCHASA-N
- SMILES: N[C@@]([H])(CCCNC(=N)N)C(=O)N[C@@]([H])(Cc1ccccc1)C(=O)NCC(=O)NCC(=O)N[C@@]([H])([C@]([H])(CC)C)C(=O)N[C@@]([H])(CC(C)C)C(=O)N[C@@]([H])(CCCCN)C(=O)N[C@@]([H])([C@]([H])(CC)C)C(=O)N[C@@]([H])(CC(C)C)C(=O)N[C@@]([H])(CCCCN)C(=O)N[C@@]([H])(CCCCN)C(=O)N[C@@]([H])(C(C)C)C(=O)N[C@@]([H])(CC(C)C)C(=O)N1[C@@]([H])(CCC1)C(=O)N[C@@]([H])(CCCCN)C(=O)N[C@@]([H])(C)C(=O)N[C@@]([H])([C@]([H])(CC)C)C(=O)N[C@@]([H])(CCCCN)C(=O)N[C@@]([H])(C(C)C)C(=O)N[C@@]([H])(C)C(=O)N[C@@]([H])(C)C(=O)N[C@@]([H])(CCC(=O)O)C(=O)N[C@@]([H])(CCSC)C(=O)N[C@@]([H])(C)C(=O)N1[C@@]([H])(CCC1)C(=O)N1[C@@]([H])(CCC1)C(=O)N[C@@]([H])(CCC(=O)N)C(=O)N[C@@]([H])(CC(=O)N)C(=O)N[C@@]([H])(CCC(=O)O)C(=O)O
- Except where otherwise noted, data are given for materials in their standard state (at 25 °C [77 °F], 100 kPa). Infobox references

Properties
Net charge	4
pI (isoelectric point)	10.83
H (hydrophobicity)	0.39
µ_{H} (hydrophobic moment)	0.422

Dk5a is a toxic peptide consisting of 29 amino acids found in the venom of the velvet ant Dasymutilla klugii. It is a cysteine-free peptide. It doesn't bind a specific receptor, but it binds and disrupts cell membranes by increasing the membrane ion conductivity. The toxin causes both pain in mammals and insecticidal effects in insects. There is no specific treatment found for Dk5a.

== Etymology ==
The prefix 'Dk' is the source species Dasymutilla klugii. '5a' stands for the peptide and its isoform within the venom peptide catalogue. Dk5A is not a channel-specific ligand and therefore has no Greek-letter prefix. The name Dasymutilla has the common name 'velvet ant' which refers to the wingless female wasps and is also called the cow killer. This name refers to the severity of the sting rather than actual lethality

== Source ==
The toxin Dk5A comes from the venom produced by female Dasymutilla klungii. This is a species of a solitary parasitoid wasp in the family Mutillidea. Despite the name 'velvet ants', they are wasps, not ants. Of the D. klungii venom, Dk5a together with Dk13a, was identified as one of the main peptides with pain-inducing properties. In other species of the genus Dasymutilla, there have been found related peptides including Dg6a.

== Chemistry ==
The toxin Dk5a consists of 29 amino acids and is a linear peptide. Its sequence is: RFGGILKILKKVLPKAIKVAAEMAPPQNE. Dk5a has a net charge of approximately +4 and an isoelectric point of 10.83. It does not contain any cysteine residues and therefore has no disulfide bonds. Its sequence shows the features characteristic of the aculeatoxins: the peptide is cationic and amphipathic, which allows it to interact with cell membranes. The tail of the peptide (VAAEMAPPQNE) is uncharged.

== Target ==
The target of Dk5a is the lipid bilayer on the cell membranes. Dk5a interacts with these membranes and increases their permeability to ions. Dk5a acts non-specifically and activates dissociated mouse sensory neurons. Furthermore, the Dasymutilla peptides can kill honeybees, so their membrane target is shared by vertebrates and insects alike. There is no specific ion channel or transporter identified as target for Dk5a.

== Mode of action ==
Dk5a does not target a specific ion channel, instead it increases cell membrane permeability to ions. Experiments performed on mouse sensory neurons demonstrated an influx of extracellular Ca^{2+}. In particular the administration of this toxin at a concentration of 10 μM caused a sustained and immediate increase in the intracellular Calcium concentration. Whole-cell patch-clamp recordings show an increase in the membrane leak currents. It has been proposed that Dk5a increases membrane permeability through the formation of membrane pores permeable to ions. However, pore formation remains a proposed mechanism rather than a directly demonstrated process

== Toxicity ==
Dk5a exhibits both pain activity in mammals and insecticidal effects. In mice, intraplantar injection of 600 pmol was performed. As a result the animal showed immediate, short lasting (2-4 minutes) pain related behavior, but paw oedema was not detectable. This observation is relevant because natural velvet ant stings can cause both pain and inflammatory swelling. The absence of oedema following the administration of isolated Dk5a suggests the contribution of this pepdite in the pain related to the venom, but other venom components may be responsible for the swelling associated with the velvet stings. In honeybees (Apis mellifera), an intrathoracic injection of 15 nmol/g of Dk5a, caused progressive immobilization and eventual death. These findings demonstrate that Dk5a has toxic effects on both vertebrate and invertebrate organisms.

== Treatment ==
No specific treatment or antidote for Dk5a has been reported. Treatments for Hymenoptera stings are focused on symptomatic relief (cold compresses and analgesics). Severe allergic reactions require immediate medical attention, in which intramuscular adrenaline is the first line of treatment.
