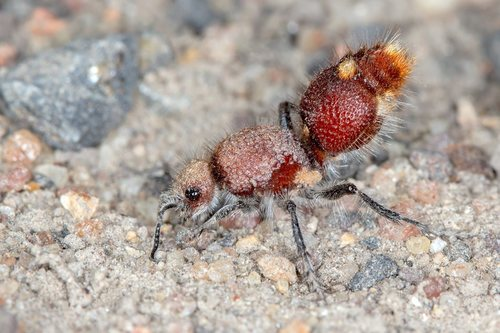
- Ephutomorpha ferruginata

Scientific classification
- Domain: Eukaryota
- Kingdom: Animalia
- Phylum: Arthropoda
- Class: Insecta
- Order: Hymenoptera
- Family: Mutillidae
- Genus: Ephutomorpha
- Species: E. ferruginata

Binomial name
- Ephutomorpha ferruginata (Westwood, 1843)

= Ephutomorpha ferruginata =

Species of wasp

Ephutomorpha ferruginata is a species of parasitoid wasp in the family Mutillidae endemic to Australia.
