= Indratilla =

Scientific classification
- Kingdom: Animalia
- Phylum: Arthropoda
- Clade: Pancrustacea
- Class: Insecta
- Order: Hymenoptera
- Family: Mutillidae
- Genus: Indratilla
- Species: I. gynandromorpha

Binomial name
- Indratilla gynandromorpha Lelej, 1993

Genus of velvet ants

Indratilla is a genus of velvet ants (family Mutillidae) described by Arkady Lelej in 1993. It is monotypic, containing only the species Indratilla gynandromorpha. The species has been recorded in Sri Lanka.
