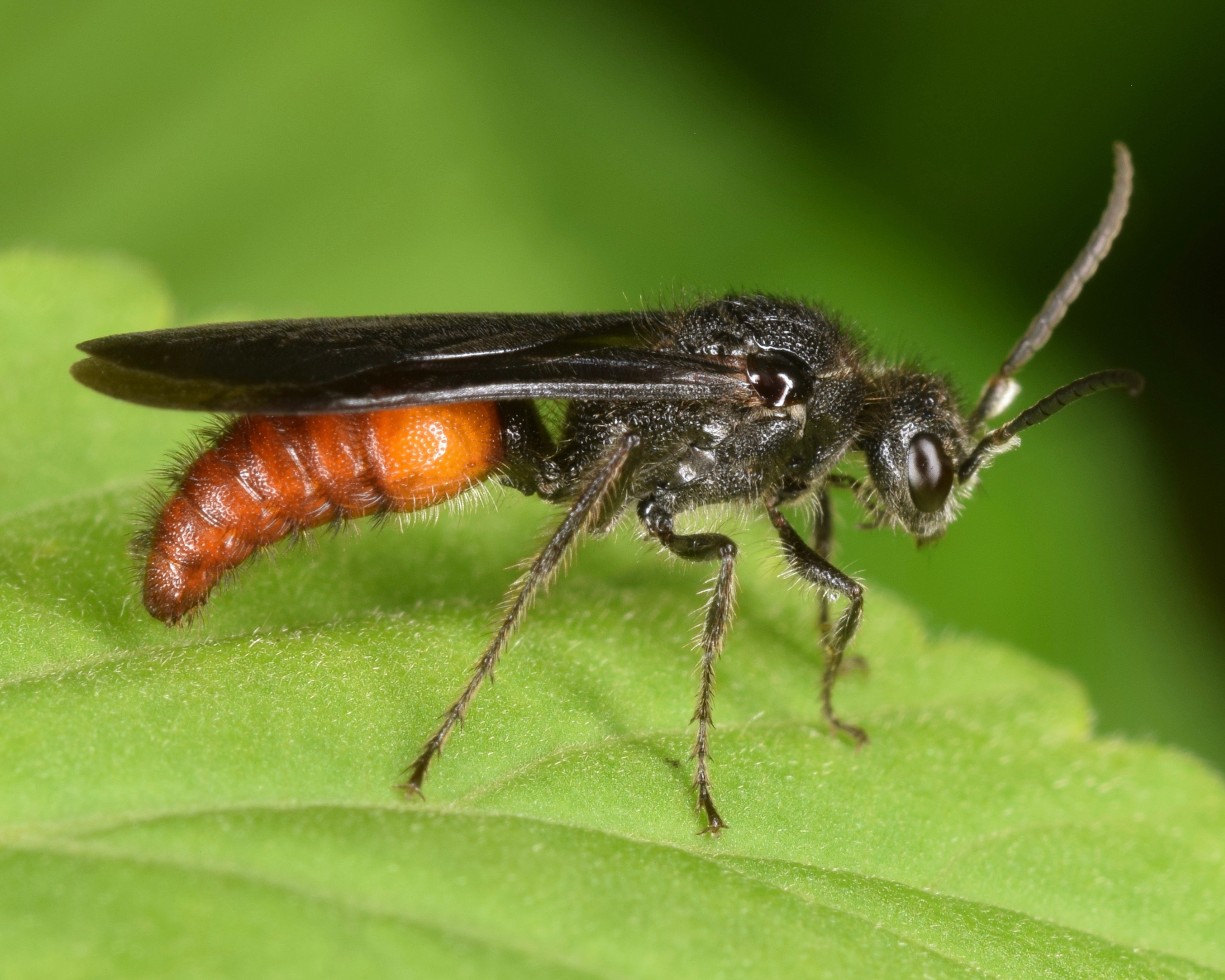
- Male of T. vagans

Scientific classification
- Kingdom: Animalia
- Phylum: Arthropoda
- Clade: Pancrustacea
- Class: Insecta
- Order: Hymenoptera
- Family: Mutillidae
- Genus: Timulla
- Species: T. vagans

Binomial name
- Timulla vagans (Fabricius, 1798)

= Timulla vagans =

Species of velvet ants

Timulla vagans is a species of velvet ant, of the Timulla genus. The species lives in the United States, Mexico, and Canada.
