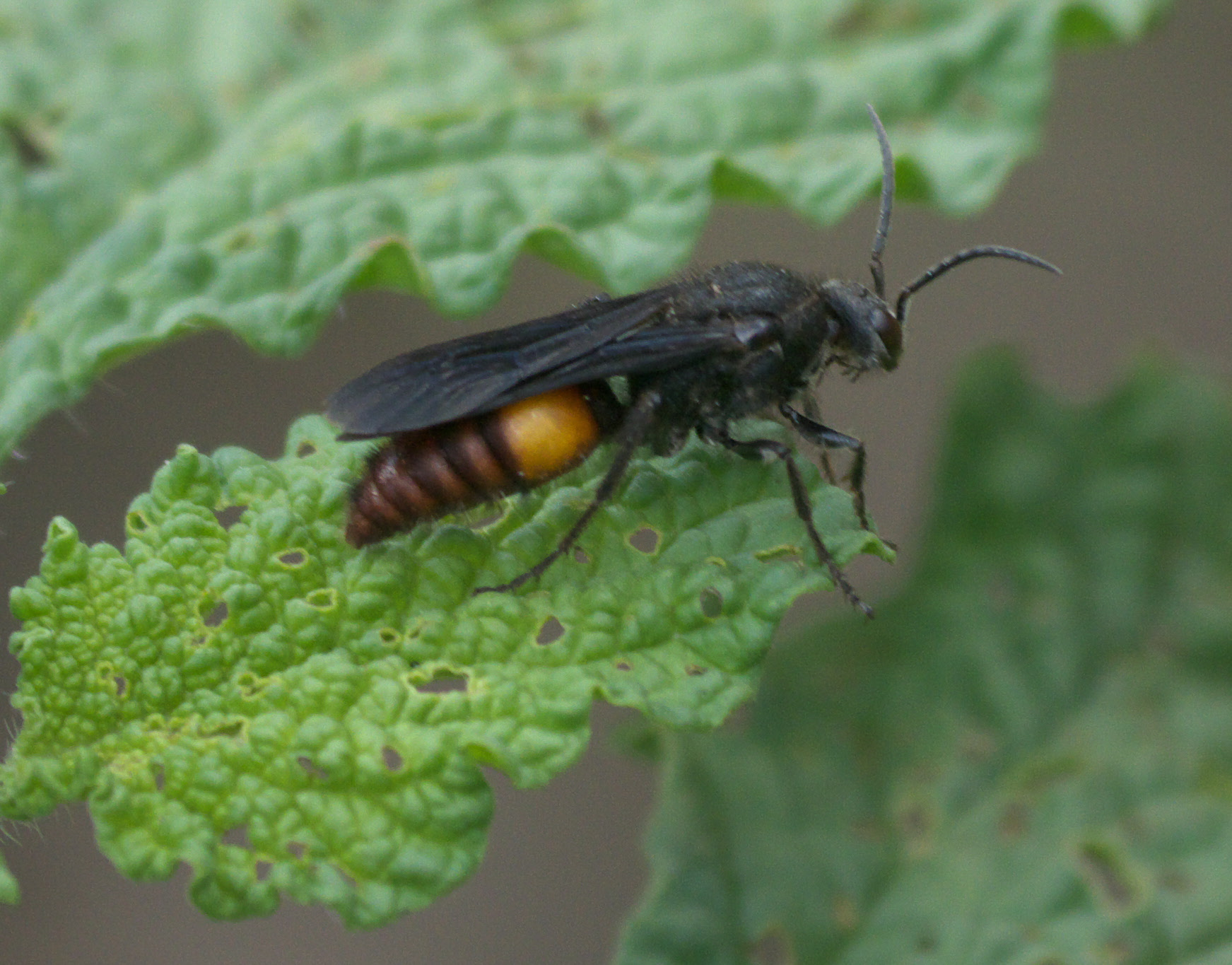

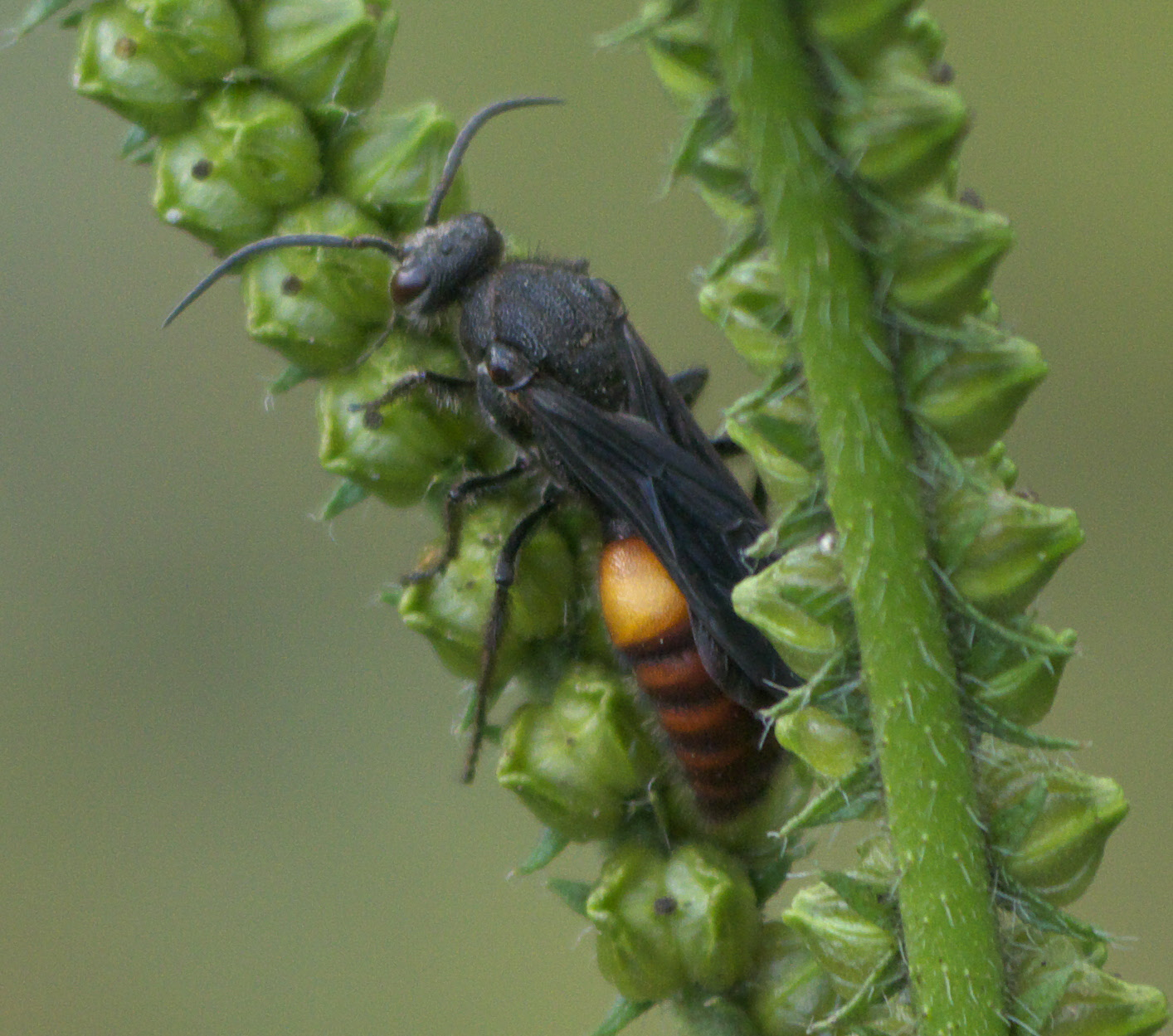

Scientific classification
- Kingdom: Animalia
- Phylum: Arthropoda
- Class: Insecta
- Order: Hymenoptera
- Family: Mutillidae
- Genus: Timulla
- Species: T. dubitata

Binomial name
- Timulla dubitata (Smith, 1855)

= Timulla dubitata =

Species of velvet ants

Timulla dubitata is a species of velvet ant of the family Mutillidae. It belongs to the Timulla genus.
