= Karlissaidia =

Scientific classification
- Domain: Eukaryota
- Kingdom: Animalia
- Phylum: Arthropoda
- Class: Insecta
- Order: Hymenoptera
- Family: Mutillidae
- Tribe: Trogaspidiini
- Genus: Karlissaidia; Lelej, 2005

Type species
- Karlissaidia medvedevi

Genus of velvet ants

Karlissaidia is a genus of velvet ants found in Sri Lanka and India.

== Etymology ==
The genus was named after Karlissa, the youngest daughter of the American entomologist Karl Vorse Krombein.

== Taxonomy ==
Karlissaidia contains the following species:

- Karlissaidia medvedevi (Lelej, 2005)
- Karlissaidia nana (Hammer, 1962)
- Karlissaidia turneri (Lelej, 2005)
- Karlissaidia sexmaculata (Swederus, 1787)
