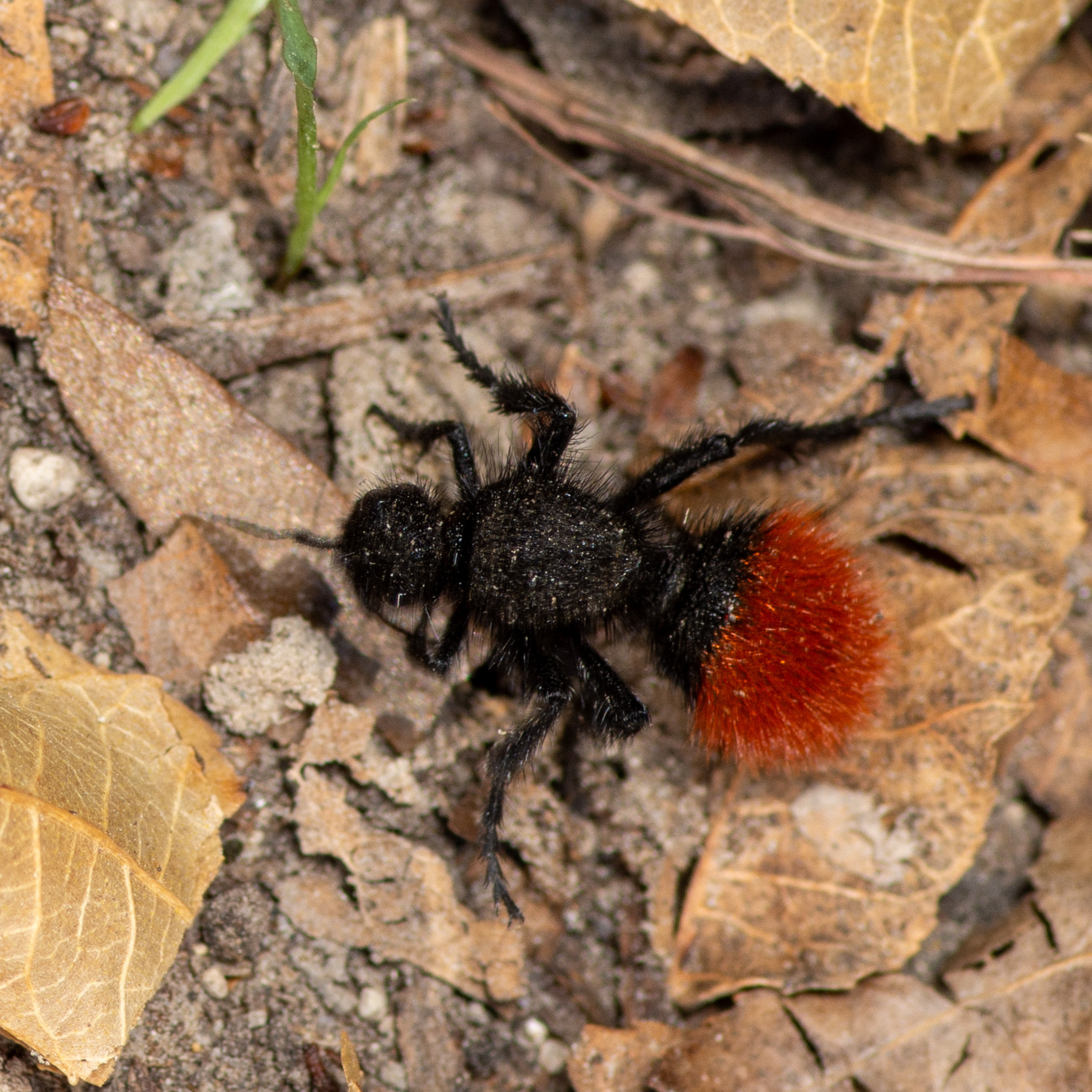

Scientific classification
- Kingdom: Animalia
- Phylum: Arthropoda
- Clade: Pancrustacea
- Class: Insecta
- Order: Hymenoptera
- Family: Mutillidae
- Genus: Dasymutilla
- Species: D. klugii

Binomial name
- Dasymutilla klugii Gray, 1872

= Dasymutilla klugii =

Species of velvet ant

Dasymutilla klugii, also known as Klug's velvet ant, is a species of velvet ant. Found in south-central North America from Utah to Puebla, it is the most commonly encountered velvet ant in Texas. Velvet ants are actually parasitic wasps, among the species used by D. klugii to incubate their young are cicada-killer wasps (Sphecius grandis).

The specific name honors German entomologist Johann C. F. Klug.

== See also ==
- Dk5a toxin from this wasp
