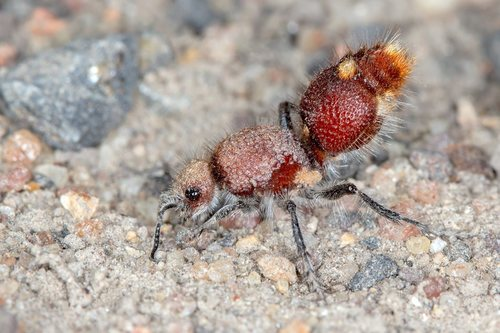
- Ephutomorpha ferruginata

Scientific classification
- Kingdom: Animalia
- Phylum: Arthropoda
- Class: Insecta
- Order: Hymenoptera
- Family: Mutillidae
- Tribe: Dasymutillini
- Genus: Ephutomorpha; André, 1902

Species
- 155 species

= Ephutomorpha =

Insect genus

Ephutomorpha is a genus of parasitoid wasp in the family Mutillidae.

== Defenses ==
Many members of this genus exhibit aposematic coloration. Ephutomorpha ruficornis is believed to use Müllerian mimicry by mimicking the colorations of Fabriogenia species.

== Species ==
- E. aciculata
- E. adjacens
- E. adjuncta
- E. aciculata
- E. aenea
- E. aeneifrons
- E. aeneiventris
- E. alata
- E. albocaudata
- E. albosignata
- E. amoena
- E. amoenula
- E. anchorites
- E. assimilis
- E. associata
- E. atroaenea
- E. atrovirens
- E. aurata
- E. auricrucis
- E. aurigera
- E. aurovestita
- E. australasiae
- E. bicolorata
- E. bilobata
- E. bipartita
- E. biplagiata
- E. bivulnerata
- E. blanda
- E. brachynota
- E. burkei
- E. caeruleiceps
- E. caliginosa
- E. carbonaria
- E. castaneiventris
- E. chalconota
- E. chalcosoma
- E. chrysochlora
- E. cockerelli
- E. cocytia
- E. comes
- E. condonensis
- E. confraterna
- E. contigua
- E. cordatiformis
- E. corusca
- E. cyaneidorsis
- E. cyanescens
- E. darwiniana
- E. dentifrons
- E. dentipes
- E. depressa
- E. diaphanopyga
- E. distinguenda
- E. diversipes
- E. edmondi
- E. egena
- E. elderi
- E. elegans
- E. emeraldiana
- E. excerpta
- E. fabricii
- E. fallax
- E. ferruginata
- E. formicaria
- E. fragilis
- E. froggatti
- E. fulvescens
- E. fulvocrinita
- E. fulvodorsalis
- E. germana
- E. gilesi
- E. gondennda
- E. haematogastra
- E. henrici
- E. hirtella
- E. hospes
- E. illustris
- E. impressiventris
- E. interjecta
- E. jucunda
- E. labeculata
- E. laetabilis
- E. lamellifrons
- E. lateralis
- E. latidentata
- E. lauta
- E. lineithorax
- E. liopyga
- E. lurida
- E. lutaria
- E. mackayensis
- E. macracantha
- E. maculata
- E. maculiventris
- E. melanaderia
- E. meranoploides
- E. mimula
- E. minuscula
- E. mira
- E. misera
- E. morosa
- E. mutabilis
- E. nepheloptera
- E. nigrociliata
- E. nigroviridis
- E. obscuriceps
- E. orphea
- E. oviventris
- E. pallidicornis
- E. pallidiventris
- E. parca
- E. peremeraldiana
- E. picta
- E. placens
- E. porrecticeps
- E. postica
- E. princeps
- E. pulchella
- E. quadriceps
- E. quadrisignata
- E. rectanguliceps
- E. redanamelia
- E. rubella
- E. rubromaculata
- E. rubropetiolata
- E. ruficornis
- E. rufomixta
- E. rugidorsis
- E. sagittifera
- E. sanguineiceps
- E. scabrosa
- E. scabrosiformis
- E. scandens
- E. scrutata
- E. scutifrons
- E. semicyanea
- E. senilis
- E. setigera
- E. sosiana
- E. subcristata
- E. subelegans
- E. trifimbriata
- E. trilineata
- E. turneri
- E. umbrosa
- E. uniformis
- E. variabilis
- E. varipes
- E. venusta
- E. viridiaenea
- E. viridiceps
- E. virulenta
- E. vittigera
- E. vivida
- E. volubilis
