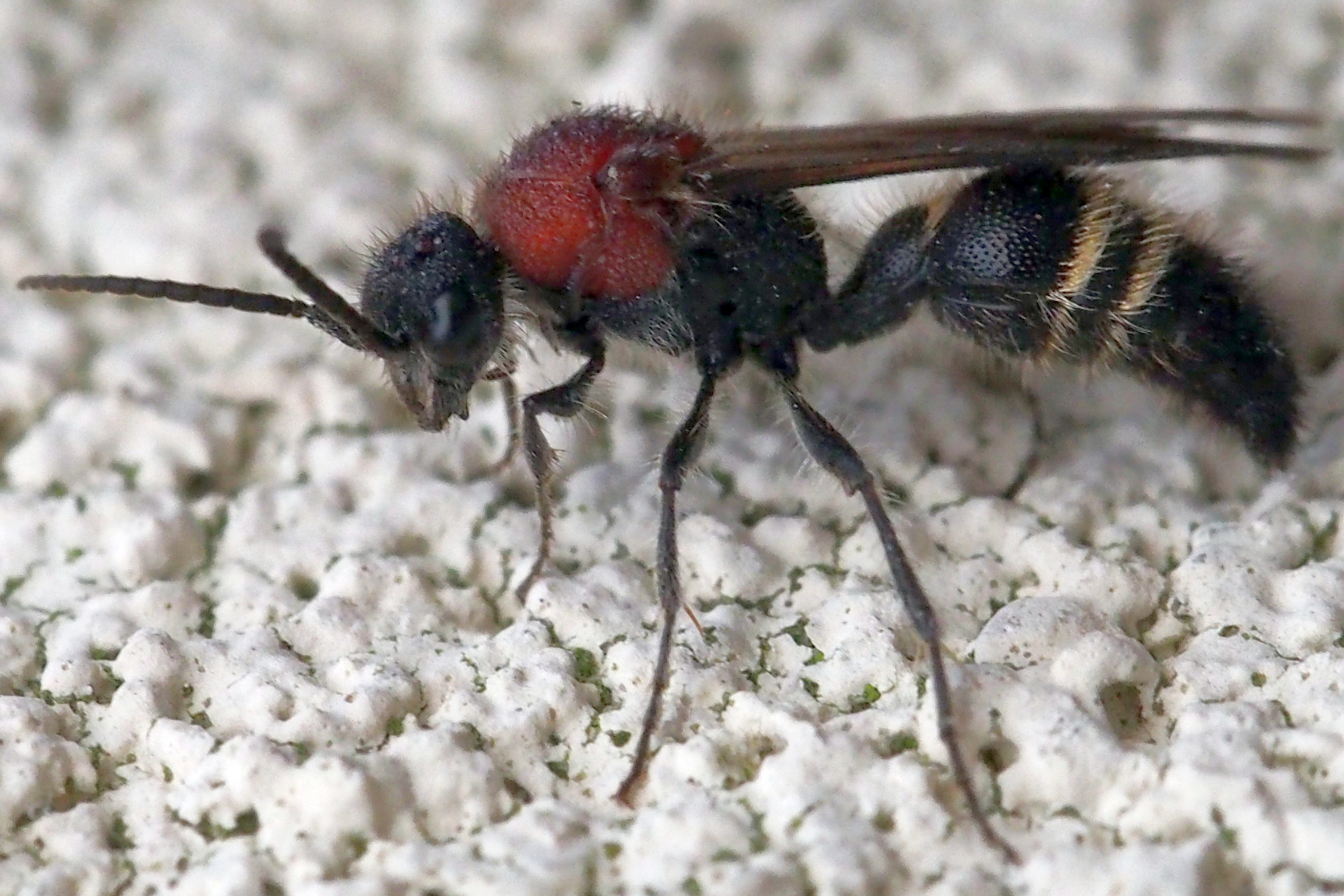
- Smicromyrme lewisi

Scientific classification
- Kingdom: Animalia
- Phylum: Arthropoda
- Class: Insecta
- Order: Hymenoptera
- Family: Mutillidae
- Genus: Smicromyrme; Thomson, 1870

= Smicromyrme =

Genus of wasps

Smicromyrme is a genus of wasps belonging to the family Mutillidae.

The species of this genus are found in Eurasia and Africa.

== Selected species ==
- Smicromyrme aborlana Tsuneki
- Smicromyrme agusii (Costa, 1884)
