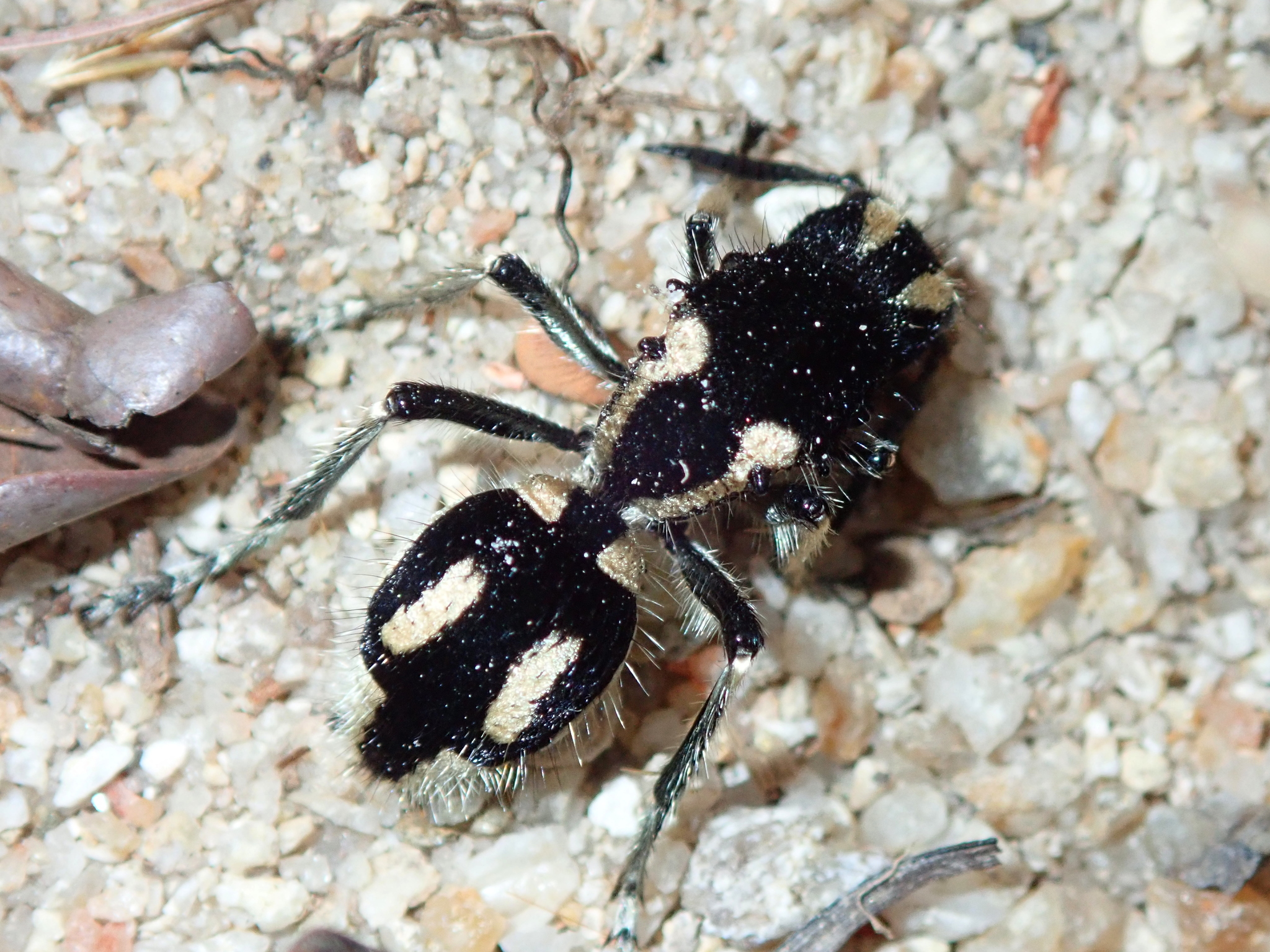
- Hoplomutilla gigantea, Tocantins, Brazil

Scientific classification
- Kingdom: Animalia
- Phylum: Arthropoda
- Clade: Pancrustacea
- Class: Insecta
- Order: Hymenoptera
- Family: Mutillidae
- Subfamily: Sphaeropthalminae
- Genus: Hoplomutilla; Ashmead, 1899

Type species
- Mutilla spinosa Swederus, 1787

= Hoplomutilla =

Genus of wasps

Hoplomutilla is a genus of velvet ants, a type of wasp, in the family Mutillidae. This genus is found in Central America and South America.

== Taxonomy ==
Hoplomutilla contains the following species:

- Hoplomutilla panamensis
- Hoplomutilla triumphans
- Hoplomutilla maculifrons
- Hoplomutilla acutangula
- Hoplomutilla caerulea
- Hoplomutilla aurigena
- Hoplomutilla sciron
- Hoplomutilla dispar
- Hoplomutilla rohweri
- Hoplomutilla biplagiata
- Hoplomutilla auromaculata
- Hoplomutilla macrogastra
- Hoplomutilla semele
- Hoplomutilla fenestrata
- Hoplomutilla traversa
- Hoplomutilla perfidiosa
- Hoplomutilla patricialis
- Hoplomutilla aemula
- Hoplomutilla uncifera
- Hoplomutilla xanthocerata
- Hoplomutilla larvata
- Hoplomutilla lanata
- Hoplomutilla rapax
- Hoplomutilla serena
- Hoplomutilla bequaerti
- Hoplomutilla pardalis
- Hoplomutilla telestes
- Hoplomutilla excentrica
- Hoplomutilla opima
- Hoplomutilla goyazana
- Hoplomutilla gabbii
- Hoplomutilla fraterna
- Hoplomutilla myops
- Hoplomutilla insignis
- Hoplomutilla sociata
- Hoplomutilla approximata
- Hoplomutilla superba
- Hoplomutilla gigantea
- Hoplomutilla spinosa
- Hoplomutilla phorcys

== See also ==
- Dasymutilla
