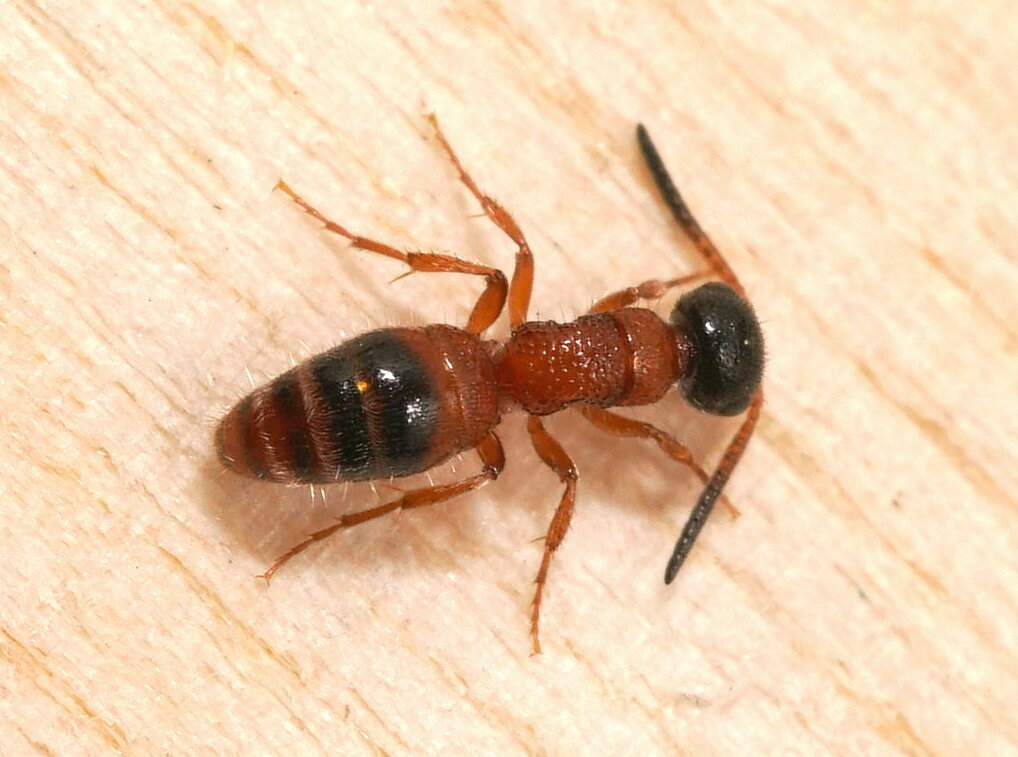

Scientific classification
- Kingdom: Animalia
- Phylum: Arthropoda
- Clade: Pancrustacea
- Class: Insecta
- Order: Hymenoptera
- Family: Myrmosidae
- Genus: Myrmosa
- Species: M. atra

Binomial name
- Myrmosa atra Panzer,1801

= Myrmosa atra =

Species of wasp

Myrmosa atra is a Palearctic species of myrmosid, a kleptoparasite in fossorial bee nests.
