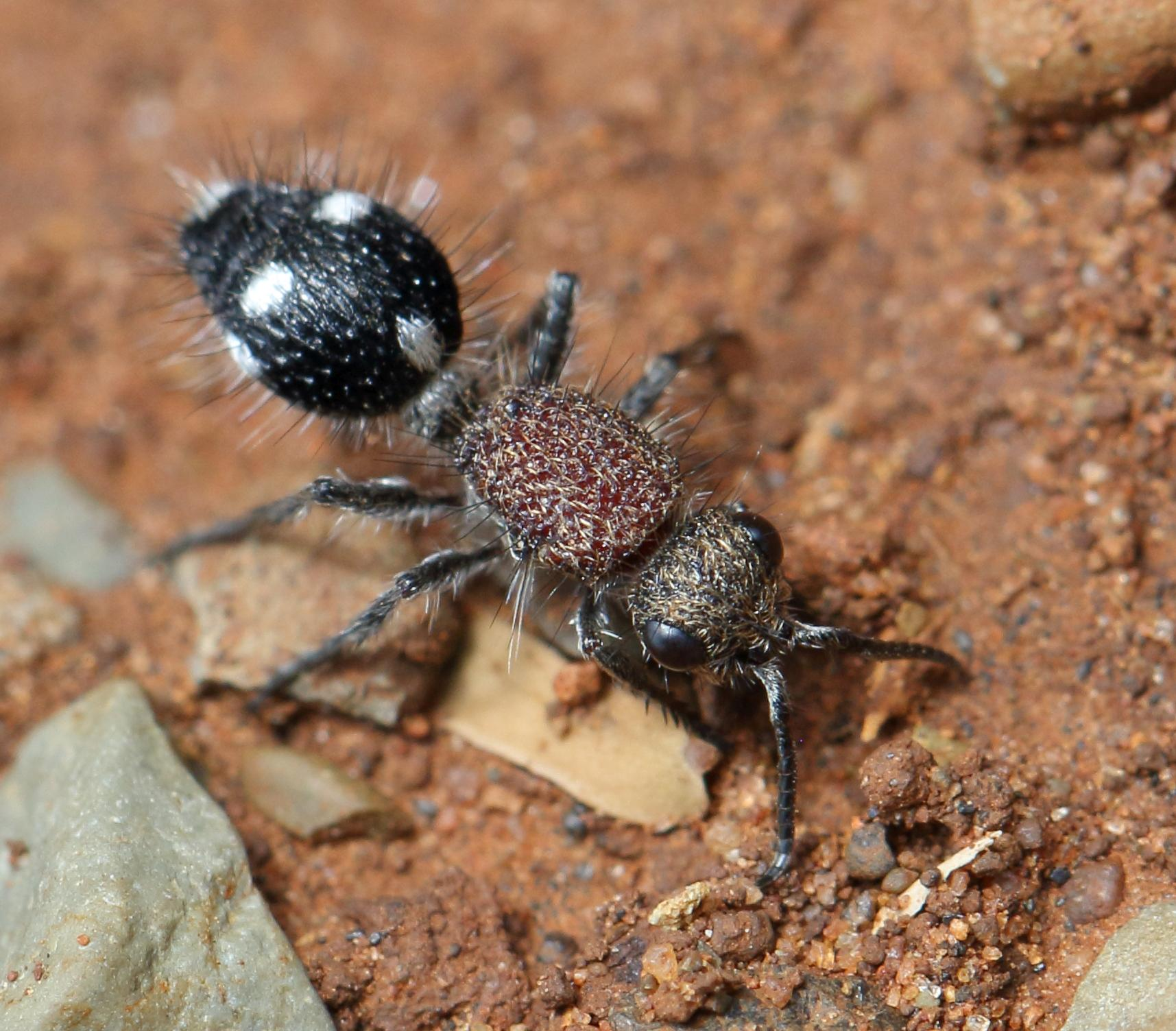
- Dasylabris stimulatrix

Scientific classification
- Domain: Eukaryota
- Kingdom: Animalia
- Phylum: Arthropoda
- Class: Insecta
- Order: Hymenoptera
- Family: Mutillidae
- Genus: Dasylabris; Radoszkowski, 1885

= Dasylabris =

Genus of wasps

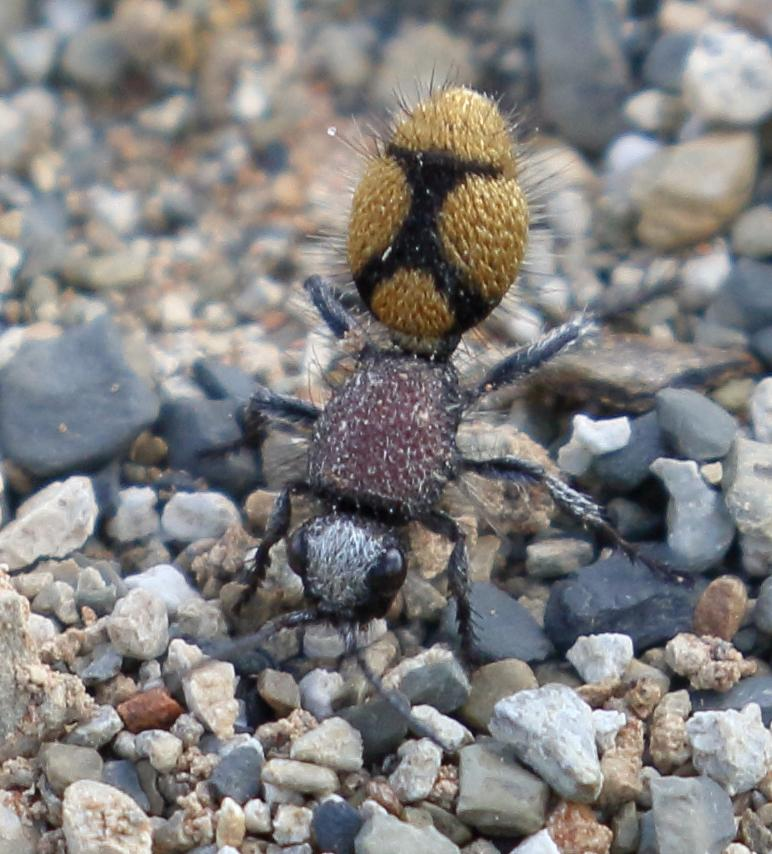
Dasylabris namaquana, Bo-Karoo, South Africa

Dasylabris is a genus of insects belonging to the family Mutillidae.

The species of this genus are found in Eurasia and Africa.

== Species ==
- Dasylabris adversa
- Dasylabris alluaudi
- Dasylabris anna
- Dasylabris antigone
- Dasylabris argentipes
- Dasylabris atrata
- Dasylabris autonoe
- Dasylabris balucka
- Dasylabris bassutorum
- Dasylabris basutorum
- Dasylabris braunsi
- Dasylabris bulawayoensis
- Dasylabris celimene
- Dasylabris danae
- Dasylabris deckeni
- Dasylabris deiopeia
- Dasylabris doriae
- Dasylabris egregia
- Dasylabris filum
- Dasylabris gravis
- Dasylabris grisea
- Dasylabris gussakovskii
- Dasylabris iberica
- Dasylabris inflatua
- Dasylabris intermedia
- Dasylabris juxtarenaria
- Dasylabris kandla
- Dasylabris kraciva
- Dasylabris lobifera
- Dasylabris lugubris
- Dasylabris makanga
- Dasylabris mandersternii
- Dasylabris manderstiernii
- Dasylabris mashuna
- Dasylabris matiesa
- Dasylabris matiese
- Dasylabris maura
- Dasylabris melicerta
- Dasylabris mephitidiformis
- Dasylabris mephitis
- Dasylabris merope
- Dasylabris miogramma
- Dasylabris mongolica
- Dasylabris namaquana
- Dasylabris phrygia
- Dasylabris regalis
- Dasylabris rugosa
- Dasylabris saga
- Dasylabris schultzeit - orange velvet ant
- Dasylabris siberica
- Dasylabris stimulatrix
- Dasylabris terpsichore
- Dasylabris thais
- Dasylabris unipunctata
- Dasylabris vittata
- Dasylabris voeltzkowi
- Dasylabris zimini
