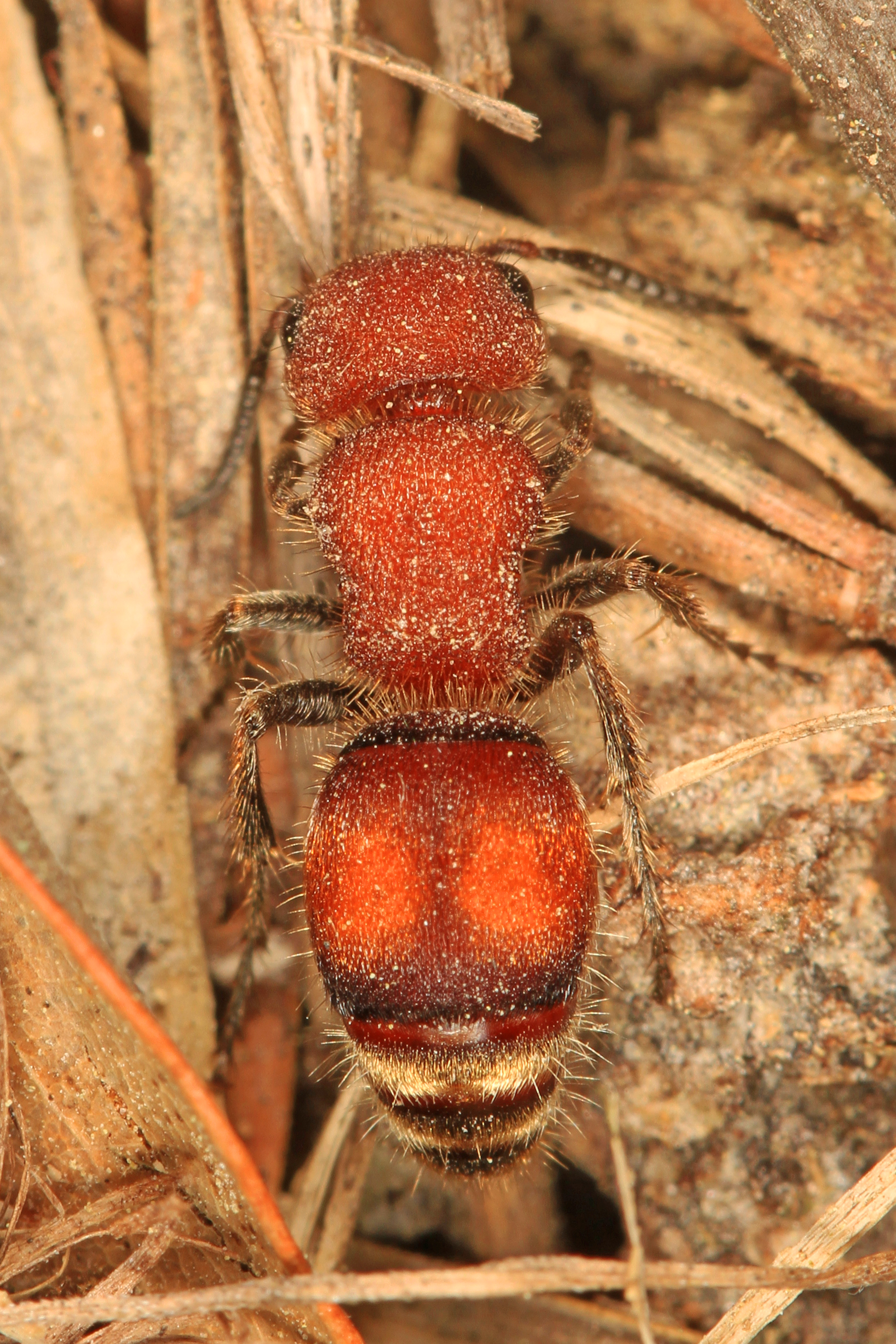

Scientific classification
- Domain: Eukaryota
- Kingdom: Animalia
- Phylum: Arthropoda
- Class: Insecta
- Order: Hymenoptera
- Family: Mutillidae
- Genus: Pseudomethoca; Ashmead, 1896

= Pseudomethoca =

Genus of wasps

Pseudomethoca is a genus of velvet ants in the family Mutillidae. There are at least 20 described species in Pseudomethoca.

== Species ==
These 24 species belong to the genus Pseudomethoca:

- Pseudomethoca anthracina^{b}
- Pseudomethoca athamas^{b}
- Pseudomethoca bequaerti^{b} (striped velvet ant)
- Pseudomethoca brazoria^{b}
- Pseudomethoca contumax^{b}
- Pseudomethoca diligibilis Mickel, 1952^{g}
- Pseudomethoca donaeanae^{b}
- Pseudomethoca flammigera^{b}
- Pseudomethoca frigida^{b}
- Pseudomethoca oceola^{b}
- Pseudomethoca oculata^{b}
- Pseudomethoca paludata^{b}
- Pseudomethoca pergrata Cresson, 1902^{g}
- Pseudomethoca plagiata (Gerstäcker, 1874)^{g}
- Pseudomethoca praeclara^{b}
- Pseudomethoca propinqua (Cresson, 1865)^{b}
- Pseudomethoca puchella Mickel, 1952^{g}
- Pseudomethoca pumila Burmeister, 1855^{g}
- Pseudomethoca quadrinotata^{b}
- Pseudomethoca sanbornii^{b}
- Pseudomethoca simillima (Smith, 1855)^{b}
- Pseudomethoca torrida Krombein, 1954^{b}
- Pseudomethoca vanduzei^{b}
- Pseudomethoca virgata Mickel, 1952^{g}

Data sources: i = ITIS, c = Catalogue of Life, g = GBIF, b = Bugguide.net
