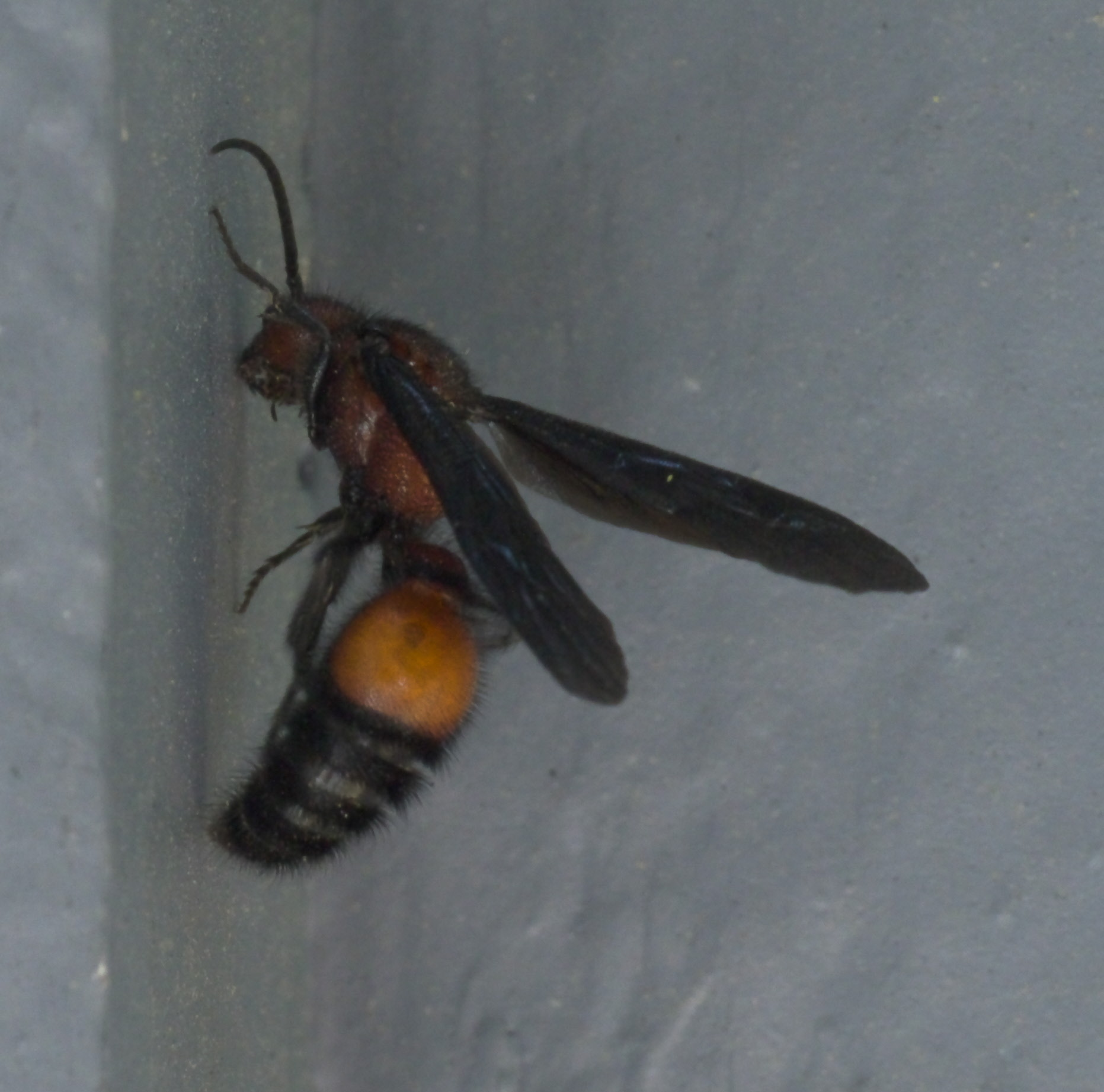
- Sphaeropthalma pensylvanica (male)

Scientific classification
- Domain: Eukaryota
- Kingdom: Animalia
- Phylum: Arthropoda
- Class: Insecta
- Order: Hymenoptera
- Family: Mutillidae
- Subfamily: Sphaeropthalminae
- Tribe: Sphaeropthalmini
- Genus: Sphaeropthalma; Blake, 1871

Synonyms
- Agama Blake, 1871; Photopsis Blake, 1886; Sphaerophthalma Blake, 1886; Micromutilla Ashmead, 1899; Pyrrhomutilla Ashmead, 1899; Neophotopsis Ashmead, 1903; Physetapsis Schuster, 1958; Photopsioides Schuster, 1958

= Sphaeropthalma =

Genus of wasps

Sphaeropthalma is a genus of velvet ants (a type of wasp) described by C.A. Blake in 1871 within the family Mutillidae.

== Description ==
Sphaeropthalma are among the smaller velvet ants. Many species have red hair (common to many species in the family), while a few are more pink or white, or black. The genus is largely made up of species that are active only at night. Some, however, are active during the day. The ones which have pink hair are nocturnal.

== Habitat ==
Most dry areas, or open areas.

== Behavior ==
Scurries along the ground, in search of solitary wasp nests, which it will parasitize.

== Host species ==
These wasps prefer to lay their eggs in nests of bembicine wasps, e.g. sand wasps and horse guard wasps.

== Species ==
These species belong to the genus Sphaeropthalma:

- Sphaeropthalma acontius Fox, 1899
- Sphaeropthalma albopilosa Blake, 1872
- Sphaeropthalma amphion Fox, 1899
- Sphaeropthalma anaspasia Cockerell and Rohwer, 1908
- Sphaeropthalma angulifera Schuster, 1958
- Sphaeropthalma arenicola Schuster, 1958
- Sphaeropthalma arota Cresson, 1875
- Sphaeropthalma auripilis Blake, 1871
- Sphaeropthalma baboquivari Schuster, 1958
- Sphaeropthalma becki Ferguson, 1967
- Sphaeropthalma bellerophon Fox, 1899
- Sphaeropthalma bisetosa Schuster, 1958
- Sphaeropthalma blakeii Fox, 1893
- Sphaeropthalma borealis Schuster, 1958
- Sphaeropthalma boweri Schuster, 1944
- Sphaeropthalma brachyptera Schuster, 1945
- Sphaeropthalma capricornis Rohwer, 1909
- Sphaeropthalma ceres Fox, 1899
- Sphaeropthalma ceyxoides Schuster, 1958
- Sphaeropthalma clara Cresson, 1865
- Sphaeropthalma coaequalis Cameron, 1896
- Sphaeropthalma coloradensis Dalla Torre, 1897
- Sphaeropthalma contrahenda Dalla Torre, 1897
- Sphaeropthalma danaus Blake, 1871
- Sphaeropthalma dentifera Schuster, 1958
- Sphaeropthalma difficilis Baker, 1905
- Sphaeropthalma diomeda Fox, 1899
- Sphaeropthalma dirce Fox, 1899
- Sphaeropthalma ecarinata Schuster, 1958
- Sphaeropthalma edwardsii Cresson, 1875
- Sphaeropthalma erato Blake, 1879
- Sphaeropthalma erigone Fox, 1899
- Sphaeropthalma facilis Cameron, 1896
- Sphaeropthalma ferruginea Blake, 1879
- Sphaeropthalma ferruginopsis Schuster, 1958
- Sphaeropthalma fuscipes Schuster, 1958
- Sphaeropthalma halcyone Fox, 1899
- Sphaeropthalma helicaon Fox, 1899
- Sphaeropthalma hyalina Blake, 1871
- Sphaeropthalma hypermnestra Fox, 1899
- Sphaeropthalma ignacio Schuster, 1958
- Sphaeropthalma imperialiformis Viereck, 1906
- Sphaeropthalma imperialis Blake, 1871
- Sphaeropthalma insignis Baker, 1905
- Sphaeropthalma jacala Schuster, 1958
- Sphaeropthalma juxta Blake, 1872
- Sphaeropthalma laodamia Fox, 1899
- Sphaeropthalma luiseno Schuster, 1958
- Sphaeropthalma macswaini Ferguson, 1967
- Sphaeropthalma marpesia Blake, 1879
- Sphaeropthalma megagnathos Schuster, 1958
- Sphaeropthalma mendica Blake, 1871
- Sphaeropthalma mesillensis Cockerell, 1897
- Sphaeropthalma militaris Schuster, 1958
- Sphaeropthalma minutella Mickel, 1938
- Sphaeropthalma nanula Dalla Torre, 1897
- Sphaeropthalma neomexicana Schuster, 1958
- Sphaeropthalma noctivaga Melander, 1903
- Sphaeropthalma nokomis Blake, 1871
- Sphaeropthalma ordae Schuster, 1958
- Sphaeropthalma orestes Fox, 1899
- Sphaeropthalma pallida Blake, 1871
- Sphaeropthalma pallidipes Schuster, 1958
- Sphaeropthalma papaga Schuster, 1958
- Sphaeropthalma parapenalis Ferguson, 1967
- Sphaeropthalma parkeri Schuster, 1958
- Sphaeropthalma pateli Schuster, 1958
- Sphaeropthalma pensylvanica Lepeletier, 1845
- Sphaeropthalma pervaga Melander, 1903
- Sphaeropthalma pinalea Schuster, 1958
- Sphaeropthalma pinales Schuster, 1958
- Sphaeropthalma pluto Fox, 1899
- Sphaeropthalma reducta Schuster, 1958
- Sphaeropthalma rubriventris Schuster, 1958
- Sphaeropthalma sabino Schuster, 1958
- Sphaeropthalma sanctaefeae Cockerell, 1897
- Sphaeropthalma scudderi Schuster, 1958
- Sphaeropthalma seminanula Rohwer, 1909
- Sphaeropthalma similis Schuster, 1958
- Sphaeropthalma sonora Schuster, 1958
- Sphaeropthalma spinifera Schuster, 1958
- Sphaeropthalma subcarinata Schuster, 1958
- Sphaeropthalma sublobata Schuster, 1958
- Sphaeropthalma tetracuspis Schuster, 1958
- Sphaeropthalma triangularis Blake, 1871
- Sphaeropthalma tuberculifera Schuster, 1958
- Sphaeropthalma uro Blake, 1879
- Sphaeropthalma uvaldella Schuster, 1958
- Sphaeropthalma virguncula Blake, 1886
- Sphaeropthalma yumaella Schuster, 1958
- Sphaeropthalma zenobia Blake, 1879
- Sphaeropthalma zephyritis Fox, 1899
