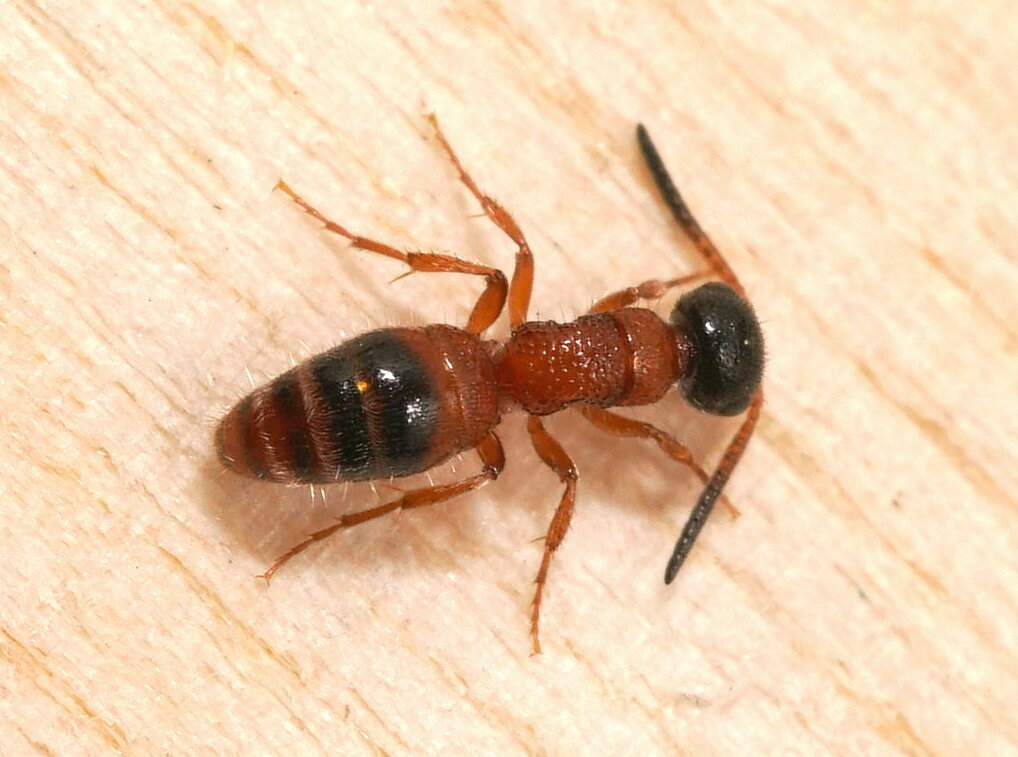
- female Myrmosa atra
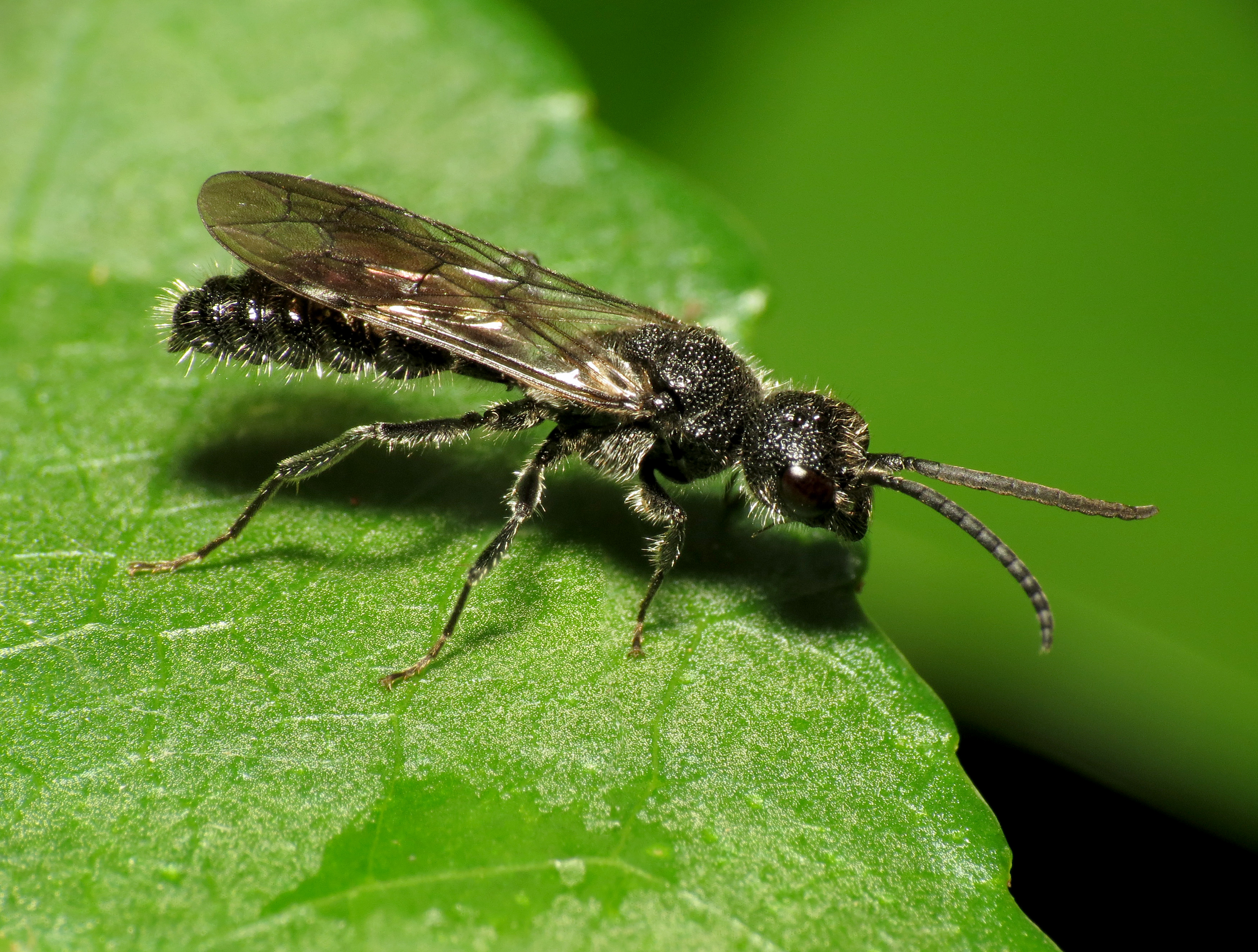
- male Myrmosa unicolor

Scientific classification
- Domain: Eukaryota
- Kingdom: Animalia
- Phylum: Arthropoda
- Class: Insecta
- Order: Hymenoptera
- Superfamily: Pompiloidea
- Family: Myrmosidae; Fox, 1894

Genera
- See text

= Myrmosidae =

Myrmosidae Temporal range: Paleogene–Recent

Family of wasps

The Myrmosidae are a small family of wasps very similar to the Mutillidae, and in the same superfamily, but sister taxon to Sapygidae. As in mutillids, females are flightless, and are kleptoparasites in the nests of fossorial bees and wasps.

== Taxonomy ==
Recent classifications of Vespoidea sensu lato (beginning in 2008) concluded that the family Mutillidae contained one subfamily that was unrelated to the remainder, and this subfamily was removed to form a separate family Myrmosidae. Myrmosids can be readily distinguished from mutillids by the lack of abdominal "felt lines" in both sexes, and the retention of a distinct pronotum in females (pronotum fused to mesonotum in mutillids).

== Genera ==
- Carinomyrmosa
- Erimyrmosa
- Krombeinella
- Kudakrumia
- Leiomyrmosa
- Myrmosa
- Myrmosina
- Myrmosula
- Nothomyrmosa
- Paramyrmosa
- Protomutilla
- Pseudomyrmosa
