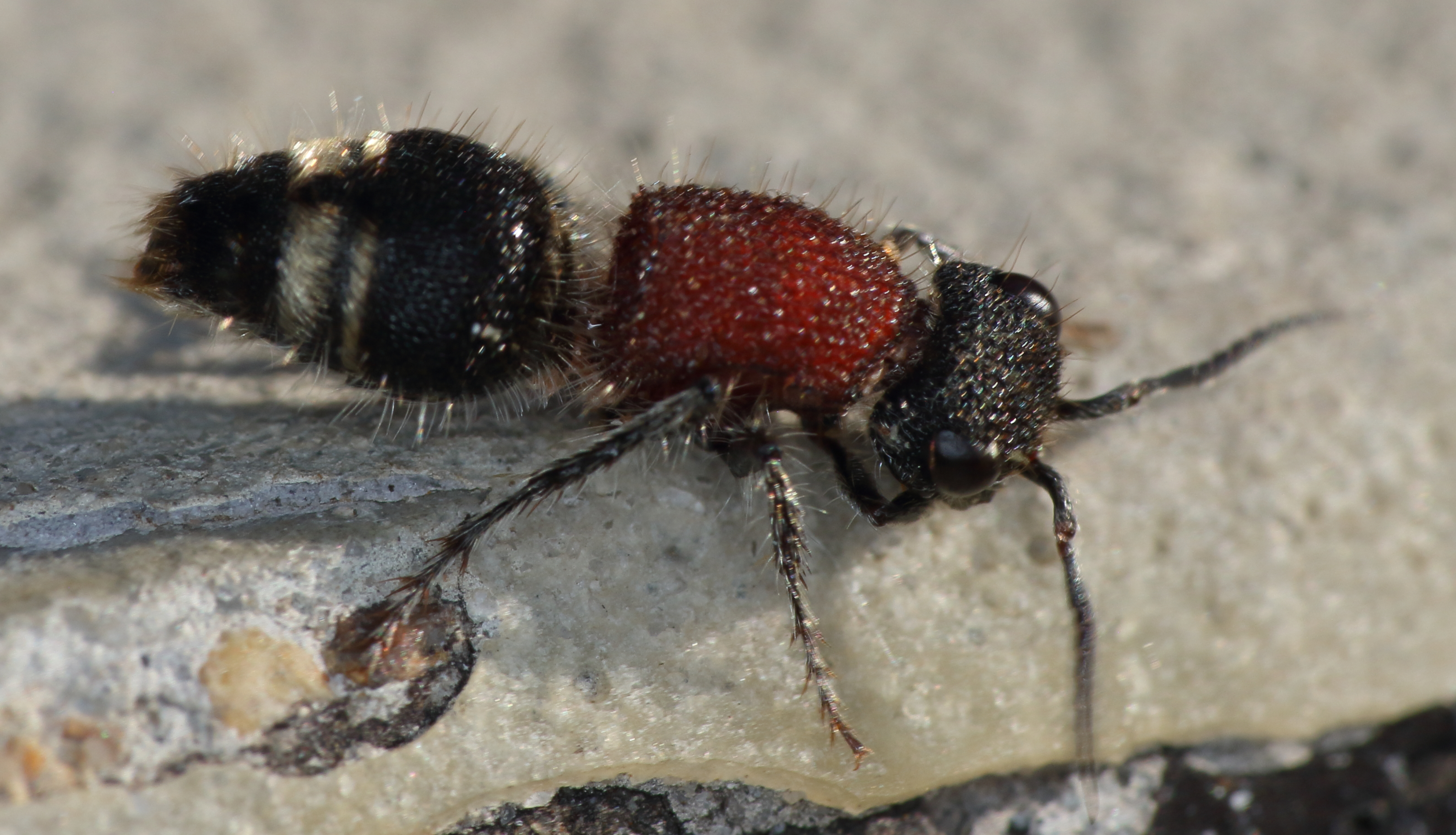
- Arcuatotilla arcuaticeps

Scientific classification
- Kingdom: Animalia
- Phylum: Arthropoda
- Class: Insecta
- Order: Hymenoptera
- Family: Mutillidae
- Genus: Arcuatotilla; Nonveiller, 1998

= Arcuatotilla =

Genus of wasps

Arcuatotilla is a genus of insects belonging to the family Mutillidae.

The only known species is Arcuatotilla arcuaticeps (André, 1905), which is found in Africa.
