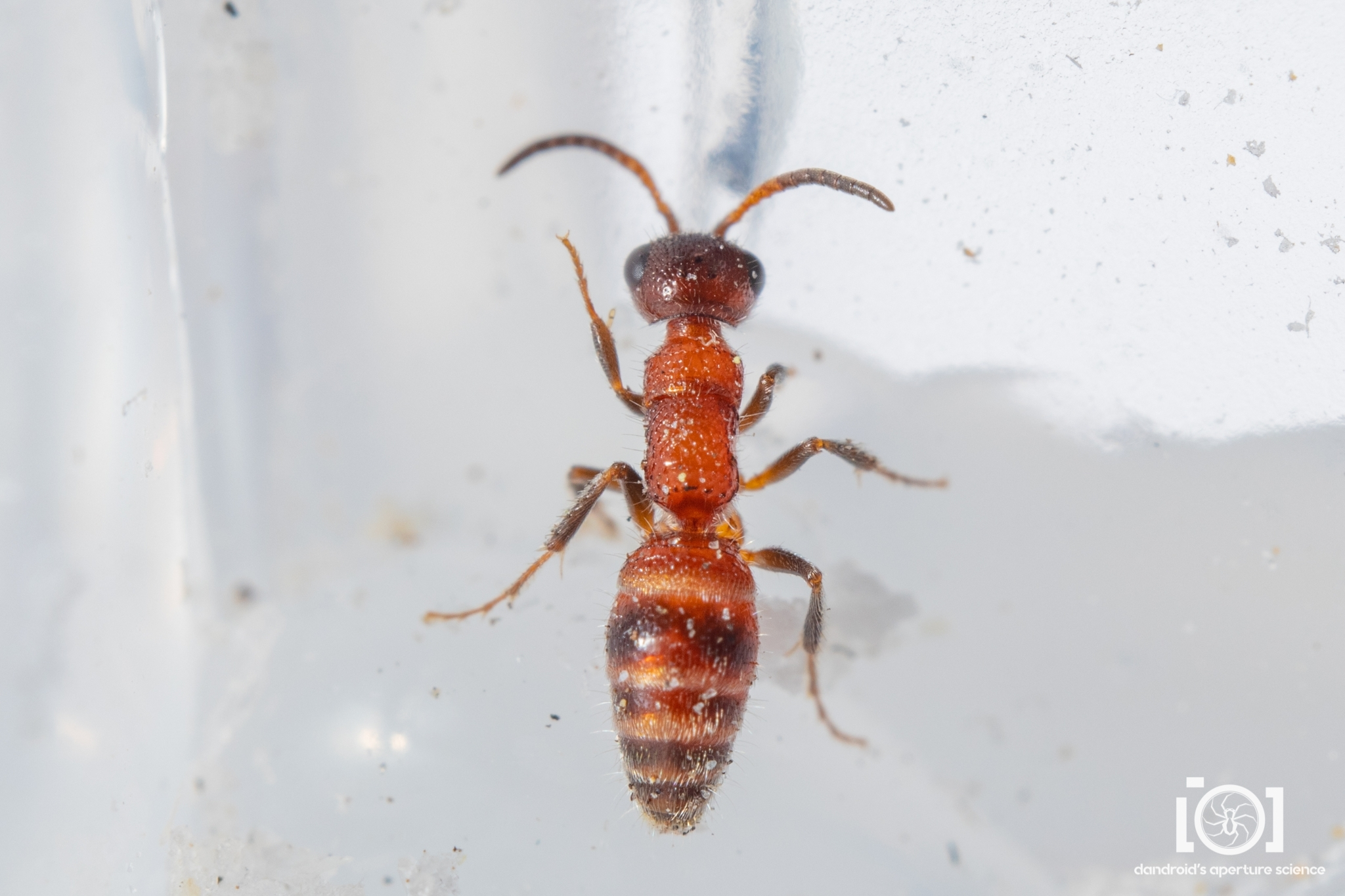

Scientific classification
- Kingdom: Animalia
- Phylum: Arthropoda
- Class: Insecta
- Order: Hymenoptera
- Family: Myrmosidae
- Genus: Myrmosa
- Species: M. unicolor

Binomial name
- Myrmosa unicolor Say, 1824

= Myrmosa unicolor =

Species of insects

Myrmosa unicolor is a species of wasp in the family Myrmosidae.
