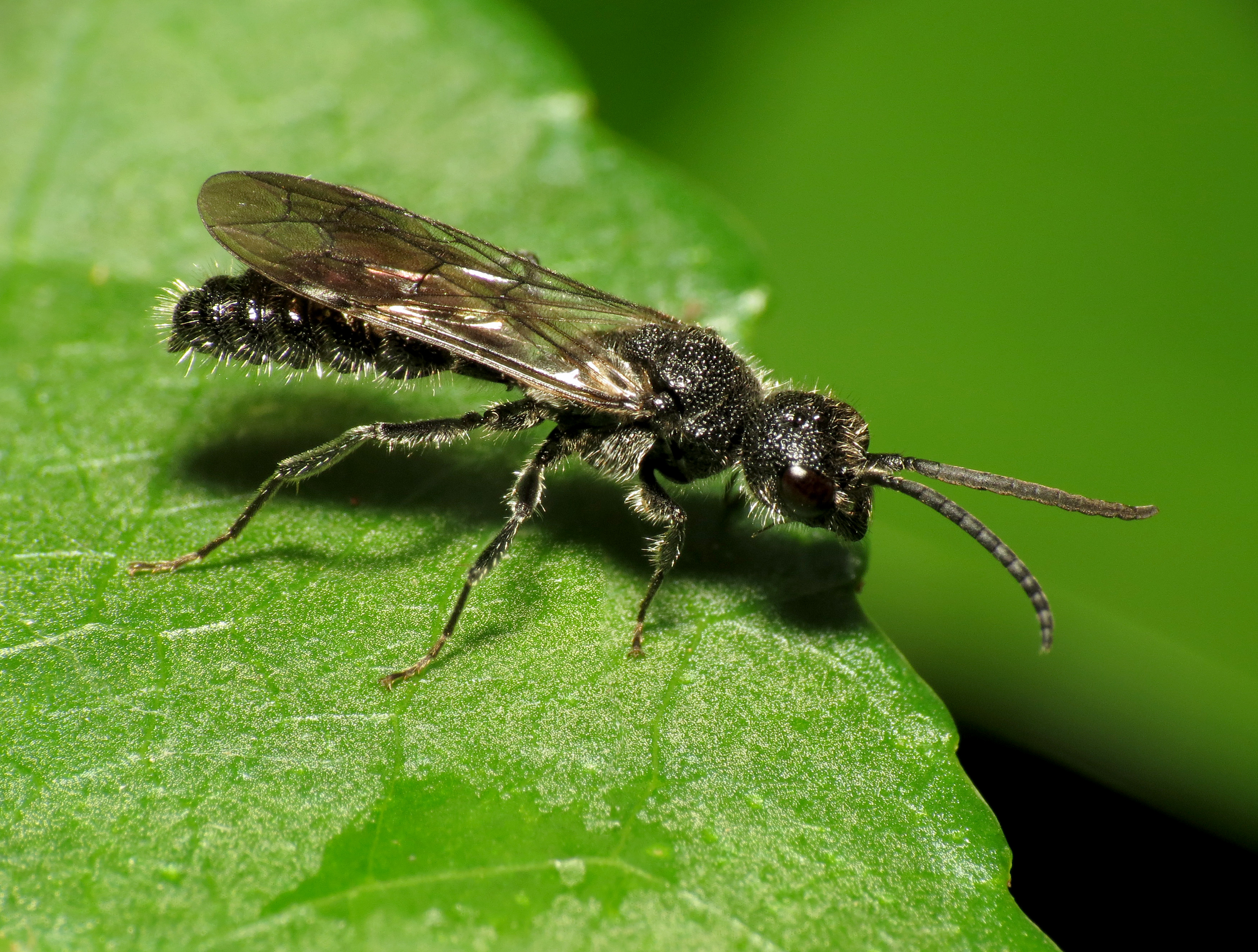
- male Myrmosa unicolor

Scientific classification
- Kingdom: Animalia
- Phylum: Arthropoda
- Class: Insecta
- Order: Hymenoptera
- Family: Myrmosidae
- Genus: Myrmosa; Latreille, 1796

= Myrmosa =

Genus of wasps

Myrmosa is a genus of wasps belonging to the family Myrmosidae.

== Selected species ==
- Myrmosa atra
- Myrmosa moesica
- Myrmosa unicolor
