= Pappognatha =

Scientific classification
- Kingdom: Animalia
- Phylum: Arthropoda
- Class: Insecta
- Order: Hymenoptera
- Family: Mutillidae
- Genus: Pappognatha; Mickel, 1939

Species
- 15 species

Genus of wasps

Pappognatha is a genus of mutillid wasps. Some members of this genus are ant mimics (e.g., Pappognatha myrmiciformis closely resembles the ant species Camponotus sericeiventris). These wasps occur in Central and South America, and are parasites in the arboreal nests of orchid bees in the genus Euglossa.
