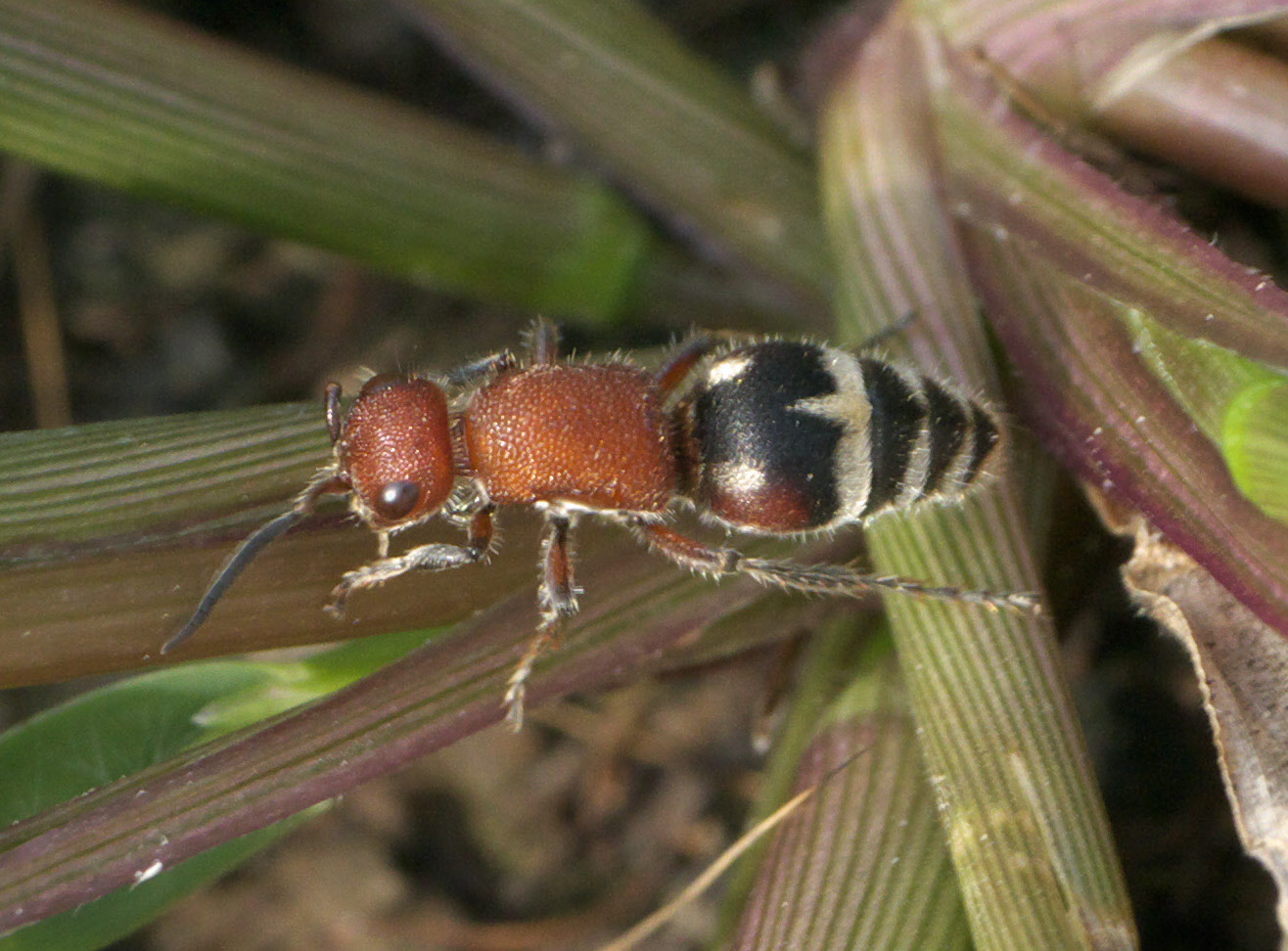

Scientific classification
- Domain: Eukaryota
- Kingdom: Animalia
- Phylum: Arthropoda
- Class: Insecta
- Order: Hymenoptera
- Family: Mutillidae
- Genus: Timulla; Ashmead, 1899

= Timulla =

Genus of wasps

Timulla is a genus of velvet ants in the family Mutillidae. There are almost 200 described species in the genus Timulla.

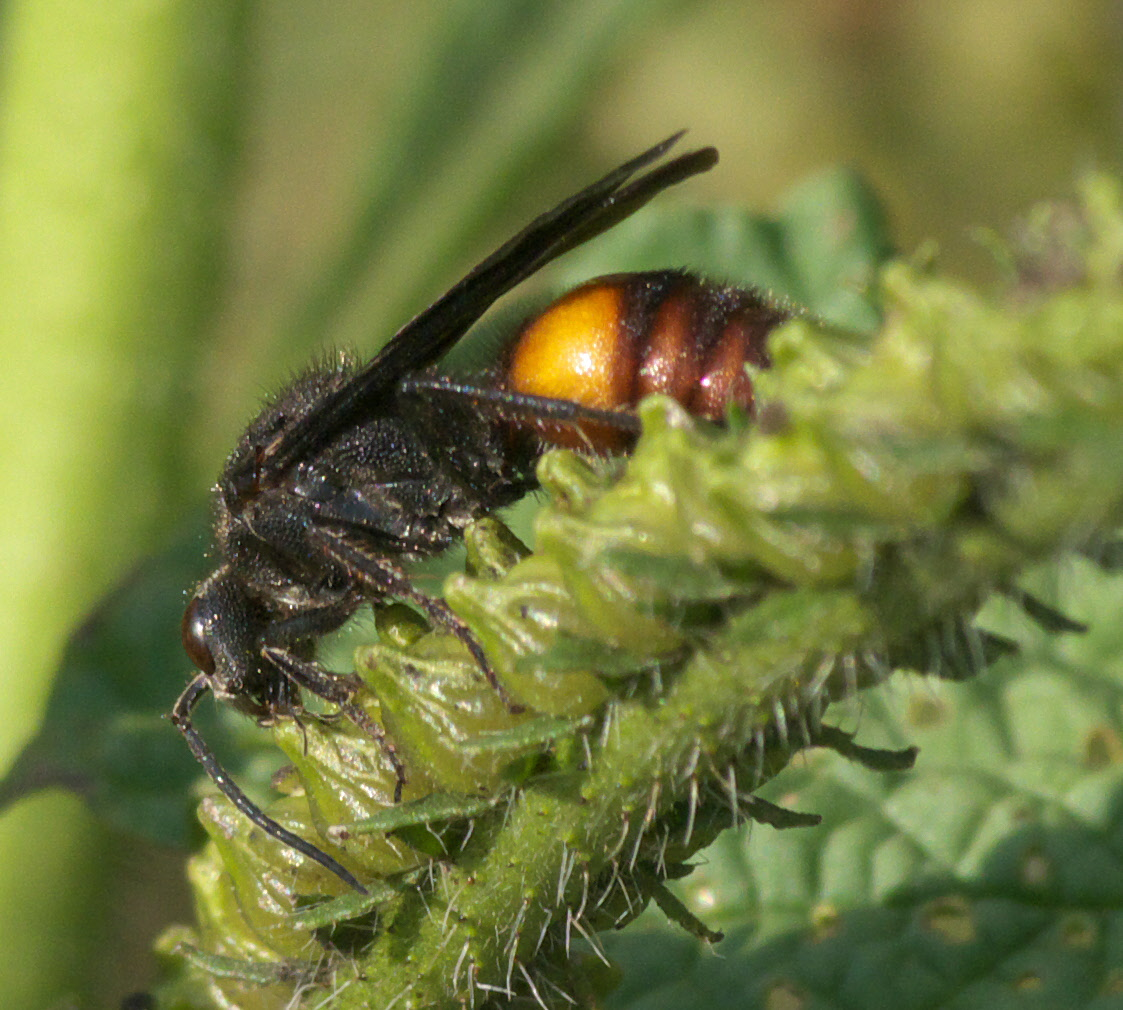

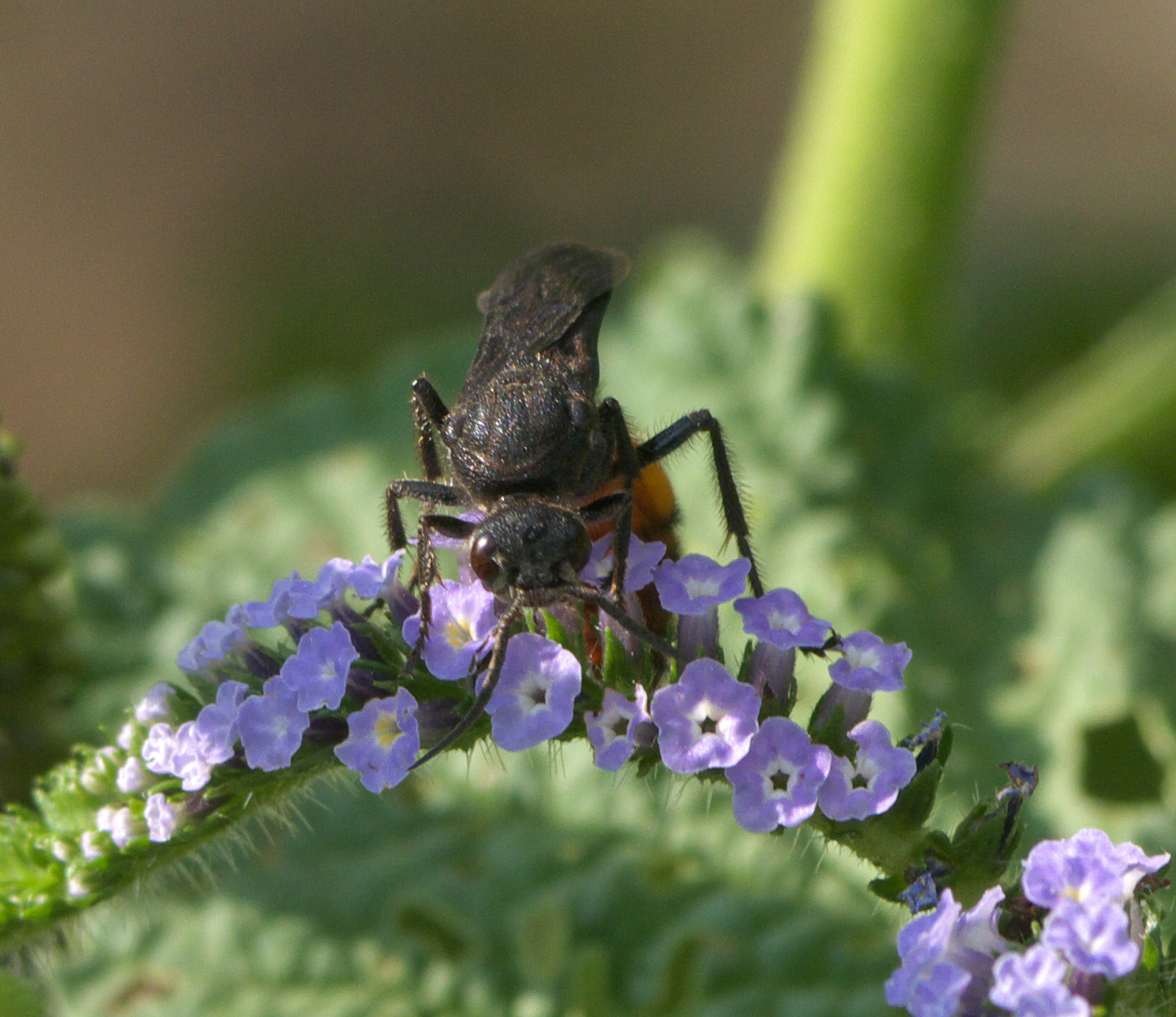

== Selected species ==
- Timulla atriceps (Smith, 1855)^{g}
- Timulla barbata^{b}
- Timulla barbigera Mickel, 1937^{b}
- Timulla bitaeniata (Spinola, 1841)^{g}
- Timulla compressicornis Mickel, 1937^{b}
- Timulla contigua^{b}
- Timulla criphyla Mickel, 1938^{g}
- Timulla dominica Mickel, 1938^{g}
- Timulla dubitata^{b}
- Timulla dubitatiformis Mickel, 1937^{b}
- Timulla eris Mickel, 1938^{g}
- Timulla euterpe^{b}
- Timulla ferrugata^{b}
- Timulla floridensis^{b}
- Timulla grotei^{b}
- Timulla guadeloupensis Mickel, 1937^{g}
- Timulla leona^{b}
- Timulla mediata (Fabricius, 1805)^{g}
- Timulla navasota^{b}
- Timulla oajaca^{b}
- Timulla obtusata Mickel, 1937^{g}
- Timulla ornatipennis^{b}
- Timulla rectangula (Spinola, 1841)^{g}
- Timulla rufogastra (Lepeletier, 1845)^{g}
- Timulla suspensa Mickel, 1937^{b}
- Timulla vagans (Fabricius, 1798)^{b}
- Timulla valeria Mickel, 1938^{g}
- Timulla zonata (Spinola, 1841)^{g}

Data sources: i = ITIS, c = Catalogue of Life, g = GBIF, b = Bugguide.net
