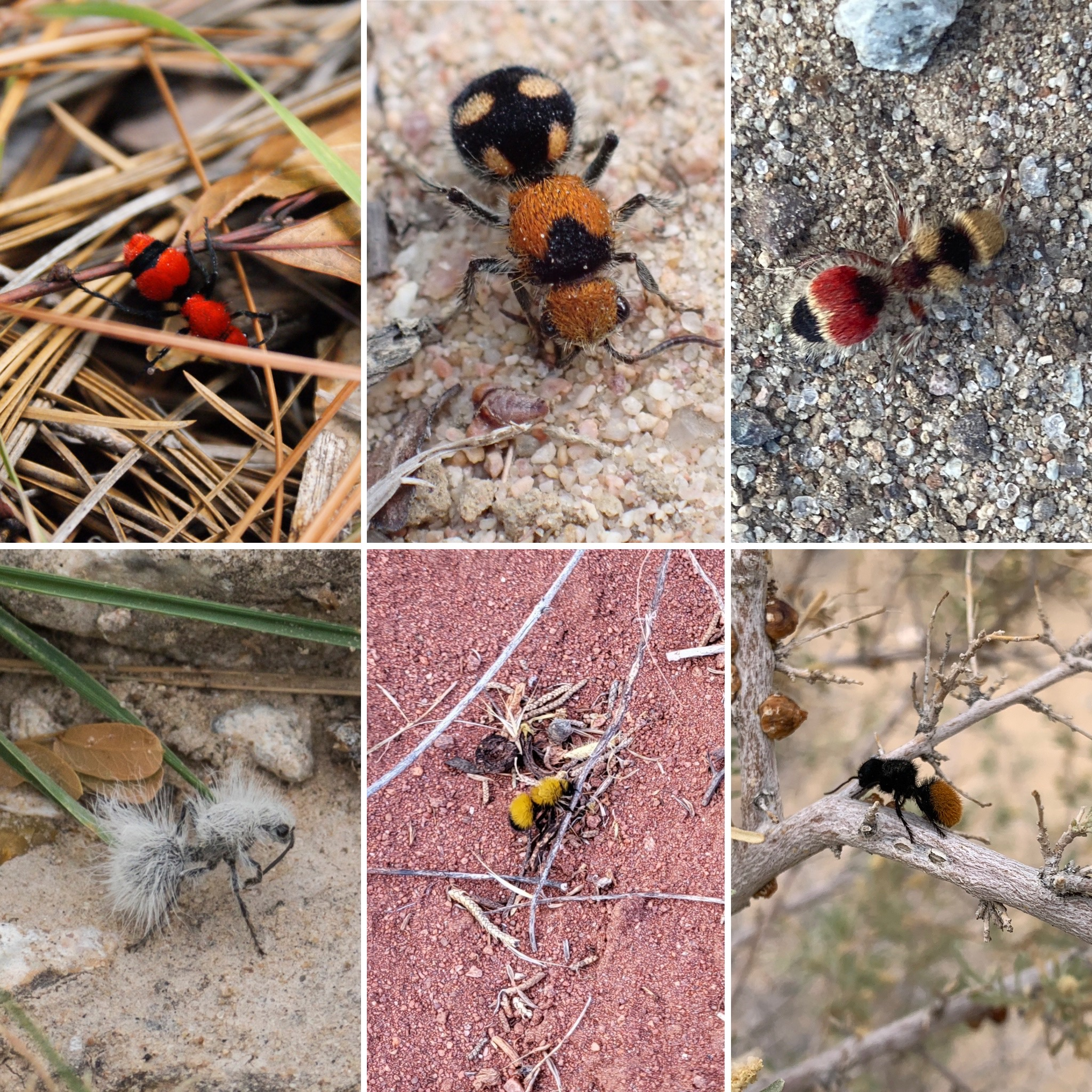
- Dasymutilla spp.

Scientific classification
- Kingdom: Animalia
- Phylum: Arthropoda
- Clade: Pancrustacea
- Class: Insecta
- Order: Hymenoptera
- Superfamily: Pompiloidea
- Family: Mutillidae; Latreille, 1802

Subfamilies
- Mutillinae; Myrmillinae; Pseudophotopsidinae; Rhopalomutillinae; Sphaeropthalminae; Ticoplinae

= Velvet ant =

Family of wasps

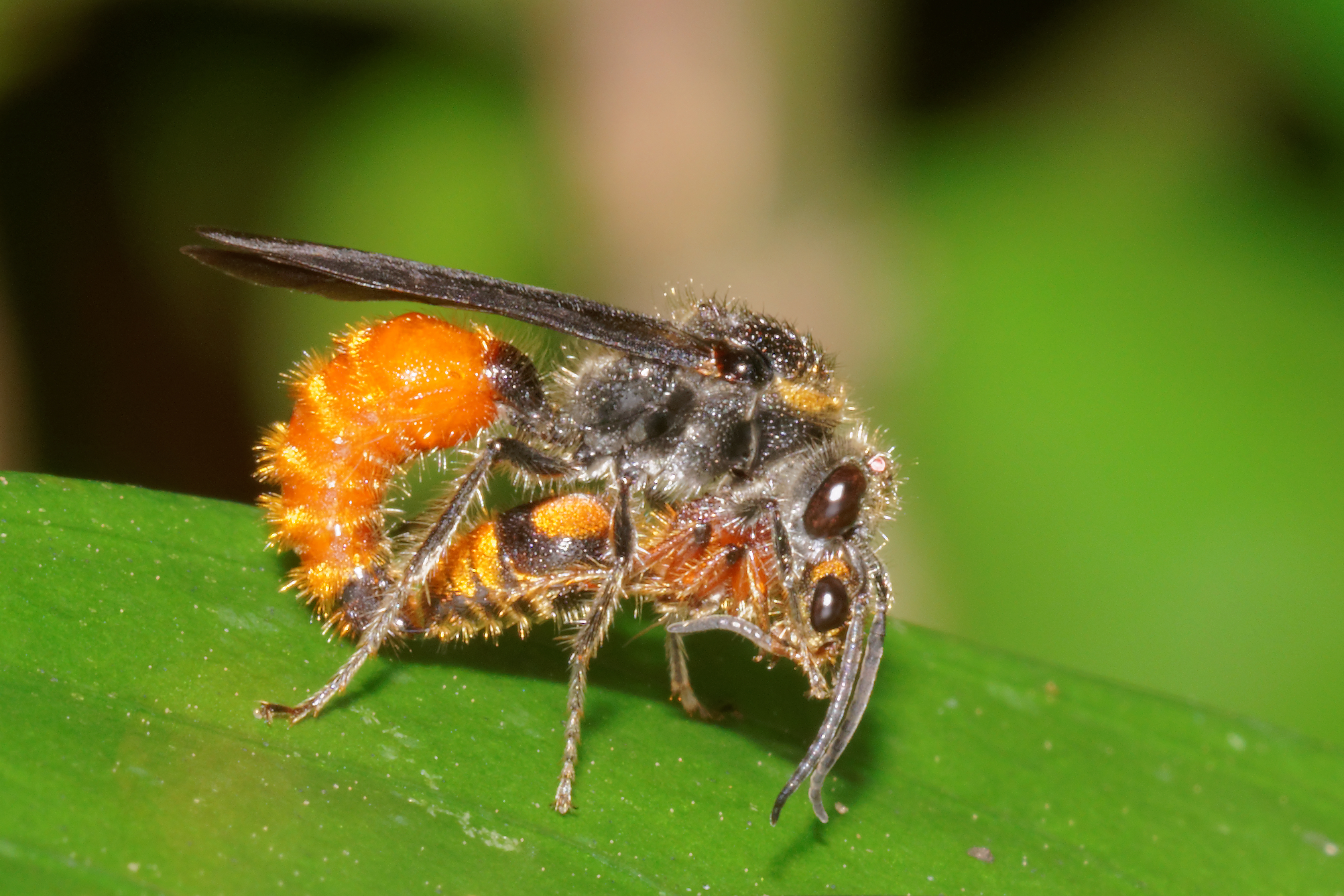
Mating pair

Velvet ants (Mutillidae) are a family of more than 7,000 species of wasps whose wingless females resemble large, hairy ants. Their common name velvet ant refers to their resemblance to an ant, and their dense pile of hair, which most often is bright scarlet or orange, but may also be black, white, silver, or gold. Their bright colors serve as aposematic signals. They are known for their extremely painful sting (the sting of the species Dasymutilla klugii rated a 3 on the Schmidt pain index and lasts up to 30 minutes), which has resulted in the common name "cow killer" or "cow ant" being applied to the species Dasymutilla occidentalis. However, mutillids are not aggressive and sting only in defense. In addition, the actual toxicity of their venom is much lower than that of honey bees or harvester ants. Unlike true ants, they are solitary, and lack complex social systems.

== Distribution ==
Mutillidae can be found worldwide with about 230 genera or subgenera and around 8,000 species worldwide. Over 400 species occur in the North American Southwest.

North American Mutillidae have eight phenotypically distinct and geographically limited Müllerian mimicry rings (Desert, Eastern, Madrean, Texan, Red-headed Timulla, Black-headed Timulla, Tropical, and Western) making up one of the largest Müllerian mimicry complexes on the planet. These mimicry rings are the result of repeated convergent evolution of aposematic traits between co-occurring velvet ant species, rather than shared phylogenetic history. Through the evolution of aposematic traits in velvet ant species in the same ring, local predators have learned to avoid these well-defended wasps.

== Description ==
The exoskeleton of all velvet ants is unusually tough (to the point that some entomologists have reported difficulty piercing them with steel pins when attempting to mount them for display in cabinets). This characteristic allows them to successfully invade the nests of their prey and also helps them retain moisture. Mutillids exhibit extreme sexual dimorphism. As in some related families in the Vespoidea, males have wings, but females are wingless. The males and females are so distinct in their morphology that entomologists often find it very hard to determine whether a given male and female belong to the same species, unless they are captured while mating. In some species, the male carries the smaller female aloft while mating, which is also seen in the related family Thynnidae.

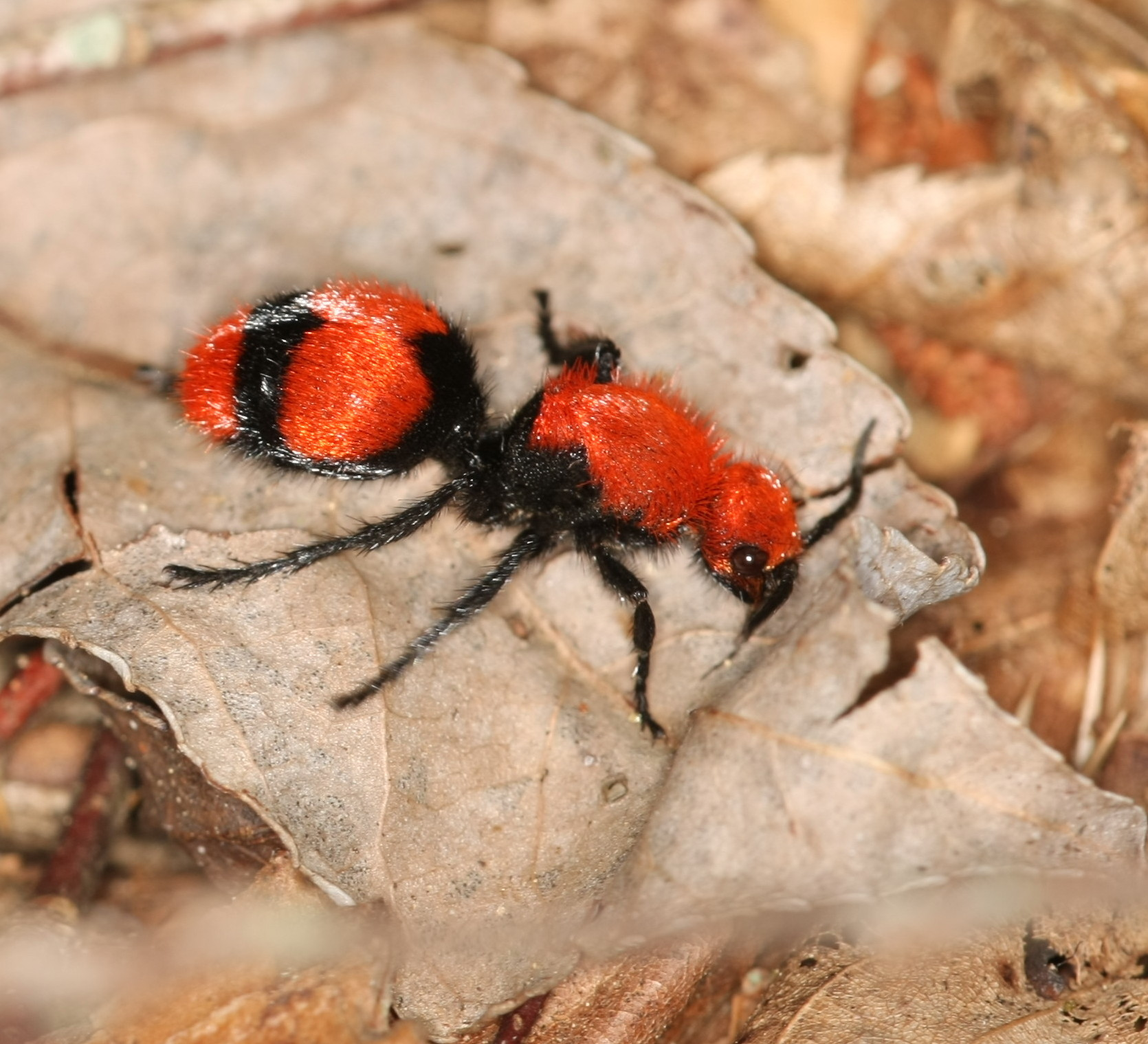
A female eastern velvet ant

As is the case for all aculeates, only female mutillids are capable of inflicting a sting. The stinger is a modified female organ called an ovipositor, which is unusually long and maneuverable in mutillids. In both sexes, a structure called a stridulitrum on the metasoma is used to produce a squeaking or chirping sound when alarmed. Both sexes of mutillids also bear hair-lined grooves on the side of the metasoma called felt lines. Only two other vespoid families (Bradynobaenidae and Chyphotidae) have felt lines, but the females of these families have a distinct pronotum, with a transverse suture separating it from the mesonotum; in female mutillids, these two thoracic segments are completely fused. Members of the family Myrmosidae, formerly classified as a subfamily of mutillids, also have a distinct pronotum in females, but lack felt lines in both sexes.

== Behavior ==
Adult mutillids feed on nectar. Although some species are strictly nocturnal, females are often active during the day. Females of Tricholabiodes thisbe are sometimes active up to two hours before sunset. Guido Nonveiller (1963) hypothesized the Mutillidae are generally stenothermic and thermophilic; they may not avoid light, but rather are active during temperatures that usually occur only after sunset.

== Defense mechanisms ==
Predation is one of the strongest forces natural selection uses to drive the evolution of an organism's morphology, physiology, and behavior. Velvet ants avoid predation using the following defense mechanisms: a venomous sting (if female), aposematic coloration, a stridulatory organ in their abdomen, an alarm secretion from their mandibular gland, and a durable exoskeleton. This array of defenses has contributed to the velvet ants being attributed the title of "the indestructible insect." This title was bestowed on them after experimental interactions between velvet ants and their potential predators that resulted in the survival of the ant and ultimate avoidance by the predator.

The venom that velvet ants inject through their stinger has been investigated for five species of Dasymutilla, revealing that they are composed primarily of peptides. According to one researcher, the painfulness of the sting of Dasymutilla klugii outscored 58 other species of stinging insects tested; the only species this researcher rated as having a more painful sting were Paraponera clavata (bullet ant), Synoeca septentrionalis (warrior wasp), and Pepsis and Hemipepsis spp. (tarantula hawks). In an experimental setting, only two lizard species (one whiptail and one side-blotched lizard) attacked a velvet ant they were exposed to. In both cases the velvet ants were exhibiting rapid lateral and vertical movements to ward off an attack. Once the attack occurred the velvet ants would immediately sting the lizards. This sting resulted in the dropping of the ants in both cases and avoidance for the remainder of the trial. The side-blotched lizard was found dead in its tank 24 hours later. The side-blotched lizard is a natural predator of velvet ants, while the whiptail is not. The aposematic coloration of velvet ants often corresponds to a specific Müllerian mimicry ring consisting of dozens of species. This offers protection because many local predators have learned to avoid prey with this same coloration. To test the aposematic coloration on birds, mealworms were painted to resemble a velvet ant. During these trials, none of the painted mealworms were consumed, while all the control mealworms were consumed immediately. However, the painted mealworms were attacked by the birds, but the birds immediately ceased the attack. These experiments provide evidence that the aposematic coloration of velvet ants causes their predators to hesitate, acting as a visual defense mechanism.

The stridulatory organ that velvet ants possess produces an audible squeaking when the abdomen is contracted. This mechanism is an auditory cue warning predators that are about to attack to stay away. In one experiment, every time a shrew got within 1 meter of a velvet ant, the velvet ant would begin stridulating. Stridulations became more frequent as the predator moved closer to the velvet ant, and the shrew never attempted to attack the velvet ant. However, different scenarios with shrews have shown that the velvet ant would also stridulate after the shrew attacked it. Every time this occurred the shrew dropped the wasp.

The exoskeleton of the velvet ant is remarkably strong. It required 11 times more force to crush than that of the honeybee. As well as being durable, the exoskeleton is also round, making it more difficult for predators to pierce it with attempted stings or bites. During all the trials that led to the fracture of a velvet ant's exoskeleton, a total of 4 times resulted in the death of that velvet ant within 24 hours. Aside from protection from predators, the exoskeleton also helps control moisture.

Due to these strong defense mechanisms, local predators generally avoid the velvet ants, so it has been difficult to determine their predators. One study found tropical and subtropical iguanian lizards (Dactyloidae) to be a local predator of velvet ants in the black-headed Timulla and tropical mimicry rings.

== Life cycle ==
A female of Nemka viduata viduata (Pallas, 1773) looks for a nest of Bembix oculata to deposit her eggs.

Male mutillids fly in search of females; after mating, the female enters a host insect nest, typically a ground-nesting bee or wasp burrow, and deposits one egg near each larva or pupa. Only a few species are known to parasitize other types of hosts; exceptions include the European velvet ant, Mutilla europaea, one of the only species that attacks social bees (e.g., Bombus), and the genus Pappognatha, whose hosts are tree-dwelling orchid bees. The mutillid larvae then develop as idiobiont ectoparasitoids, eventually killing their immobile larval/pupal hosts within a week or two. Velvet ants exhibit haplodiploid sex determination, as do other members of the superfamily Vespoidea.

== Taxonomy ==
Recent classifications of Vespoidea sensu lato (beginning in 2008) concluded that the family Mutillidae contained one subfamily that was unrelated to the remainder, and this subfamily was removed to form a separate family Myrmosidae.

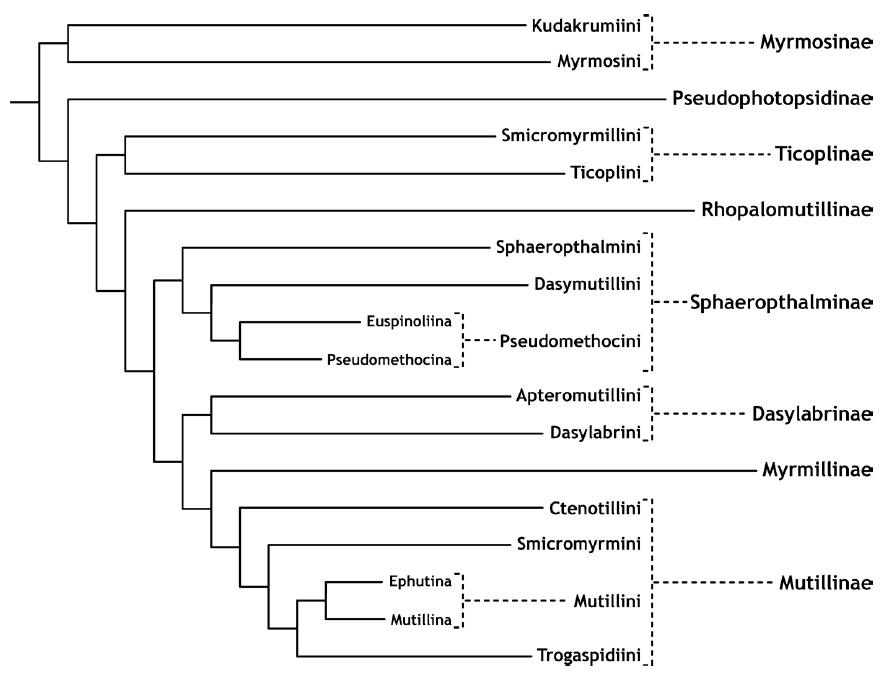
Proposed higher classification of Mutillidae

== See also ==
- List of Mutillidae genera
