= Red wasp =

Red wasp can refer to:

- Polistes carolina, a paper wasp found in the eastern United States
- Polistes rubiginosus, a paper wasp found in the eastern United States
- Polistes canadensis, a paper wasp found across the Neotropical realm, from Arizona through Central America and into South America
- Polistes major castaneicolor, a paper wasp found in the desert southwestern United States and into Sonora, Mexico
- Vespula rufa, a yellowjacket found in Eurasia
- Vespula intermedia, a yellowjacket found in North America
