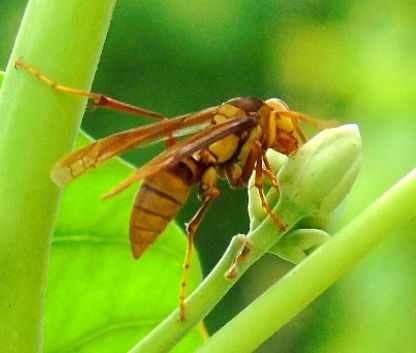
- Female P. carnifex from Mazatlán, Mexico

Scientific classification
- Kingdom: Animalia
- Phylum: Arthropoda
- Clade: Pancrustacea
- Class: Insecta
- Order: Hymenoptera
- Family: Vespidae
- Subfamily: Polistinae
- Tribe: Polistini
- Genus: Polistes
- Species: P. carnifex

Binomial name
- Polistes carnifex (Fabricius, 1775)

Synonyms
- Vespa carnifex Fabricius, 1775; Polistes onerata Lepeletier, 1836; Polistes variegatus Lepeletier, 1836; Polistes valida Say, 1837; Polistes transverso-strigata Spinola, 1851; Polistes rufipennis Latreille, 1833

= Polistes carnifex =

Species of wasp

Polistes carnifex, commonly known as the executioner wasp or executioner paper wasp, is a neotropical vespid wasp in the cosmopolitan genus Polistes.

It is a large yellow and brown paper wasp with a mandible that contains teeth. It establishes small colonies, founded by solitary queens, which build nests under the eaves of buildings or suspended from branches. Foraging adults bring nectar and macerated prey back to the nest to feed to the developing larvae which are individually housed in separate cells in the nest.

== Vernacular names ==
As its range includes only small portions of the English-speaking Americas, P. carnifex has only recently taken on an English vernacular name, but in the mid-2010s the name executioner wasp was proposed, a calque upon the Latin specific name carnifex "executioner, hangman".

In Paraguay, it is usually known in Guaraní as kava mainomby "hummingbird wasp", in reference to its great size; less commonly, it is called kava alazán "brown wasp" (more usually used for P. cavapyta), or kava sa'yju "yellow wasp" (more usually used for Agelaia multipicta or A. pallipes). In the Mexican state of Guerrero, speakers of Malinaltepec refer to the executioner wasp and the closely related P. instabilis as a'ma xtíya cháda "huarache-nest wasp", alluding to the flattened shape of the nests that they build.

== Taxonomy ==
In 1768 HMS Endeavour left Plymouth on the first voyage of James Cook, reaching the harbour of Rio de Janeiro a few months later, in November. Here one of the passengers, the wealthy naturalist Joseph Banks, procured a female specimen of giant wasp, which made its way around the world to eventually arrive in England in 1771.

Meanwhile, the Dane Johan Christian Fabricius had travelled to Uppsala University in 1762 to study under the celebrated Carolus Linnæus, and upon returning to Denmark two years later began to work on his first publication, the Systema Entomologiæ, in which he attempted to list all known species of insects (which included spiders, crabs and other arthropods at the time) according to the new Linnaean system. By 1770 he had been appointed professor at the University of Copenhagen, and when in 1773 Kiel University (now German) had been ceded to Denmark, he was soon appointed professor there. By 1771 Fabricius began making yearly summer trips to London to study the collections that Banks and others had made in foreign lands, where he was able to study Banks' Brazilian specimen of wasp at Banks' London residence. In 1775 the 832 pages of the Systema Entomologiæ were finally published, and in this Polistes carnifex was scientifically described for the first time under the name Vespa carnifex, using Banks' specimen as holotype. This specimen is now stored at the Natural History Museum, London.

In 1802 Pierre André Latreille created the genus Polistes, and in 1804 Fabricius moved this species from Vespa to the new genus.

The authority citation of the species has erroneously been attributed to Henri Louis Frédéric de Saussure, who wrote some of the most important books on the subject of wasps.

In 1853 de Saussure recognised that numerous taxa which had been described by others were synonyms of this species, and synonymised P. onerata, P. rufipennis, P. transverso-strigata and P. valida with P. carnifex. He also synonymised P. chlorostoma and P. major to it, although both are now recognised as valid species.

=== Supergeneric classification ===
The genus Polistes is the largest genus in the family Vespidae and the only genus in the tribe Polistini. It is classified in the Polistinae, the paper wasps.

=== Subgeneric classification ===
Owain Richards in 1973, and again in 1978, classified P. carnifex in a monotypic subgenus he named Onerarius. In a 1996 morphological study of most of the genus Polistes, James Michael Carpenter found this subgenus to cause the subgenus Aphanilopterus to be paraphyletic, and therefore synonymised Onerarius with the subgenus Aphanilopterus. However, by 2018 he no longer followed his own taxonomic interpretation and continued to use Richards' Onerarius.

In 1857 de Saussure was the first to attempt to organise the American Polistes species, doing so on the basis of the form of the abdomen -either conical, with the first segment broad, and tapering to a compressed last segment, with a conical and somewhat elongated metathorax; or with the abdomen oval-shaped, the first segment ampulliform (shaped like a flask) and the metathorax more flat and its end less elongated. He placed P. carnifex in a third group with characteristics in between these two, together with P. aurifer and a new species he described from Nuevo México (a Mexican territory which had recently been conquered and annexed by the US and at the time included everything in between modern California to east Texas), P. comanchus.

Among the species of Polistes which occur in Pará, Adolpho Ducke groups it with P. canadensis, P. goeldii and P. versicolor, based on the morphology of the mesopleuron.

One of the hypothesized phylogenetic trees puts P. carnifex most closely related to P. major and more distantly related to the following species: P. apachus, P. aurifer, P. bellicosus, P. carolina, P. metricus, P. poeyi haitiensis and P. perplexus. However, there has not been a consensus with regard to the phylogeny of P. carnifex so no one phylogenetic tree can be termed correct.

=== Subspecies ===
The following three subspecies are accepted:

- Polistes carnifex carnifex - found in eastern Brazil, Costa Rica, Mexico and the USA.
- Polistes carnifex boliviensis Bequaert, 1936 - found in Colombia, Peru and Bolivia.
- Polistes carnifex rufipennis (Latreille, 1833) - found in Honduras, Panama and Venezuela.
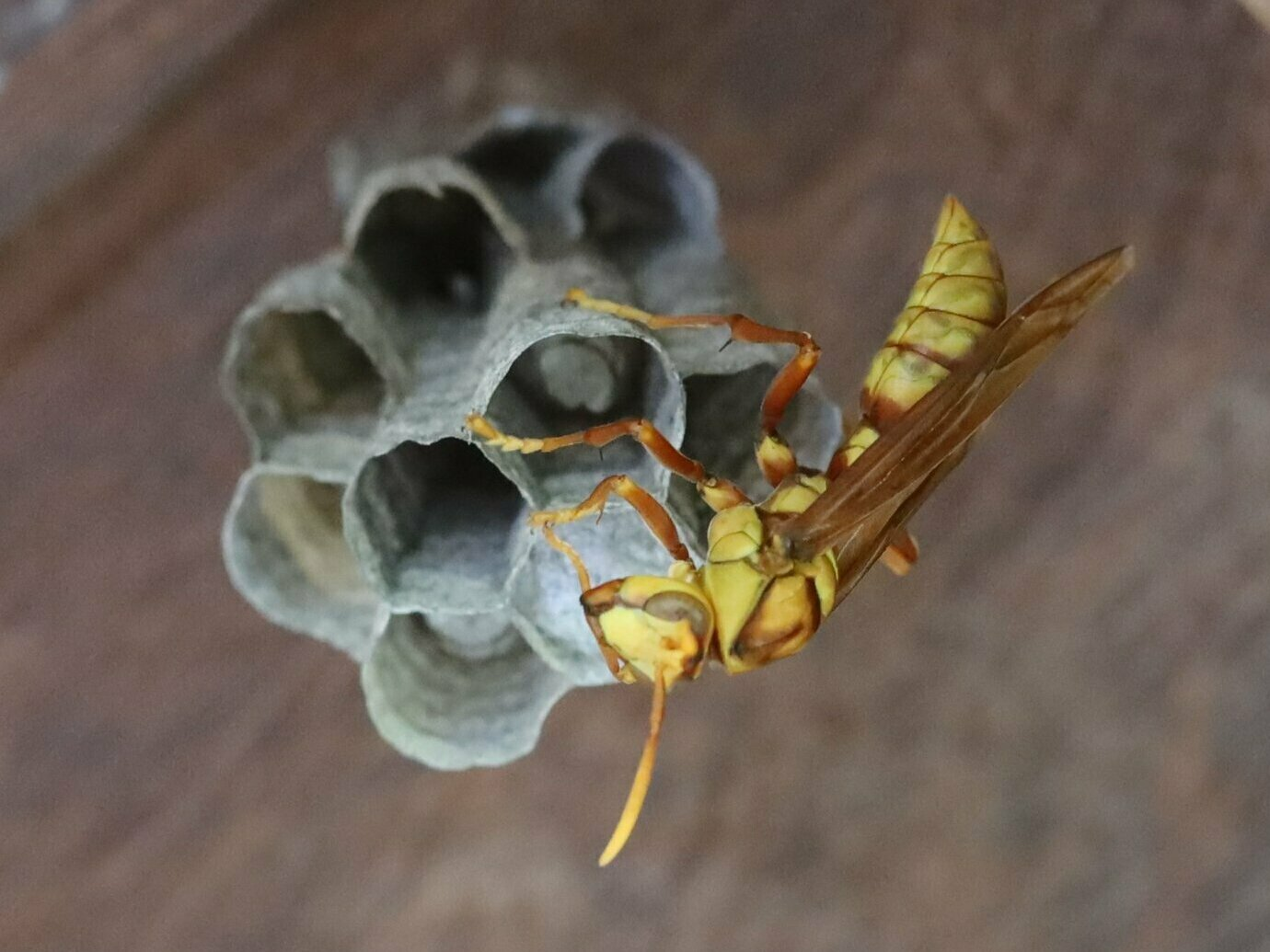
Polistes carnifex boliviensis on a nest in Colombia.

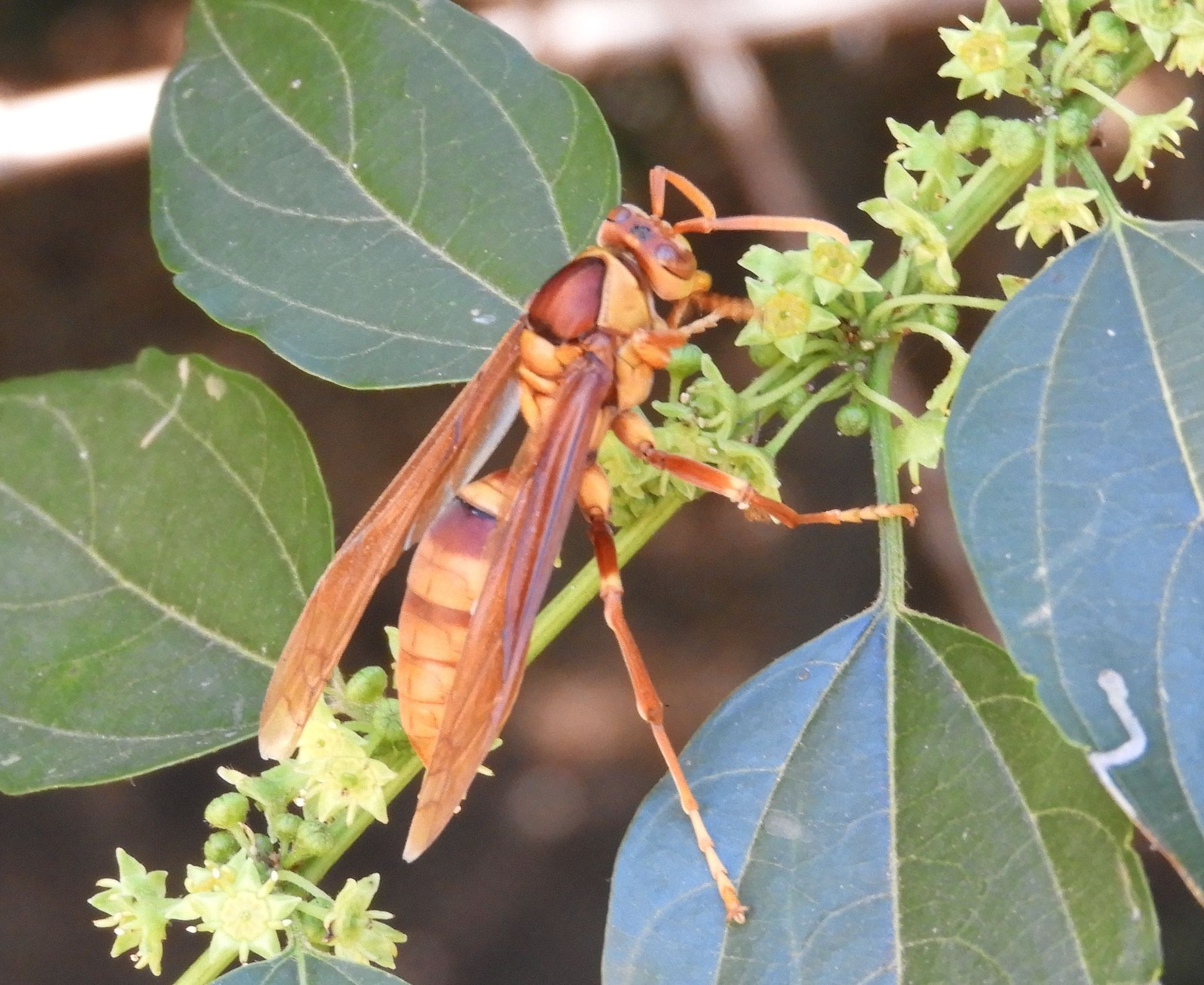
Polistes carnifex carnifex feeding in Mazatlán, Sinaloa, Mexico.

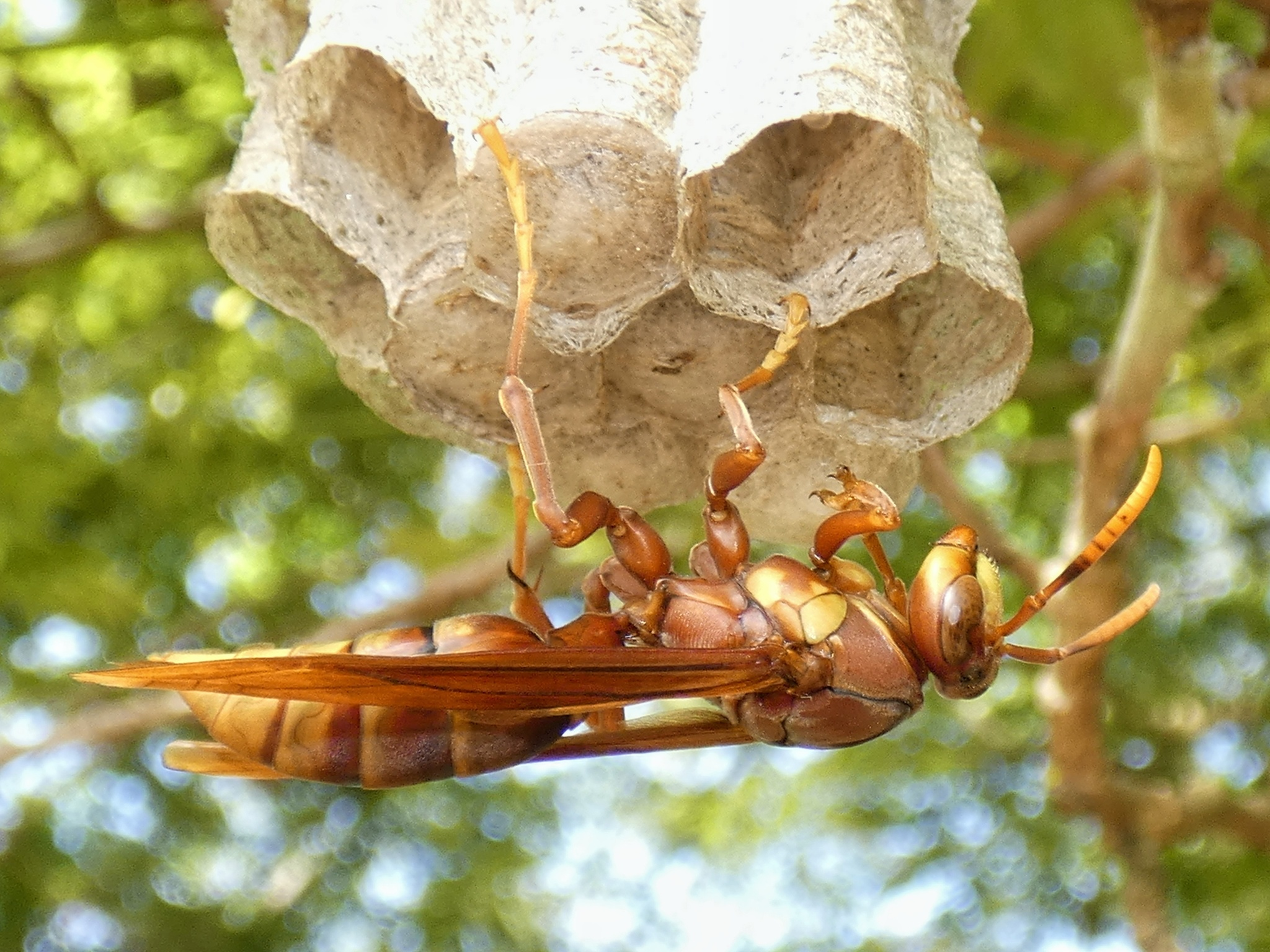
Polistes carnifex rufipennis on a nest in Panama

The holotype of P. carnifex boliviensis was collected by José Steinbach somewhere in Santa Cruz Department, Bolivia. It and three paratypes from Bolivia and Peru are stored in the Museum of Comparative Zoology, Harvard University.

P. carnifex rufipennis was originally described as P. rufipennis by Pierre André Latreille from a collection made by Alexander von Humboldt and Aimé Bonpland during their celebrated journey of scientific exploration to the Americas. The single female specimen (the holotype) was collected somewhere in Venezuela. It was synonymised with this species by de Saussure in 1853. See the section "Description" below for more on this subspecies.

=== Etymology ===
The etymology of the specific epithet carnifex is from the Latin language, where it means an 'executioner' or a 'hangman', with the implied meanings of 'tormentor' or 'murderer', with the word used as an insult in the sense of 'scoundrel', 'villain' or 'rascal'. The Latin word carnis, meaning 'meat', combined with the genitive plural suffix -fex, derived from the word facio, and meaning '-maker' (among a number of similar concepts), together give 'flesh-maker'. (Carnifex : Butcher)

== Description ==
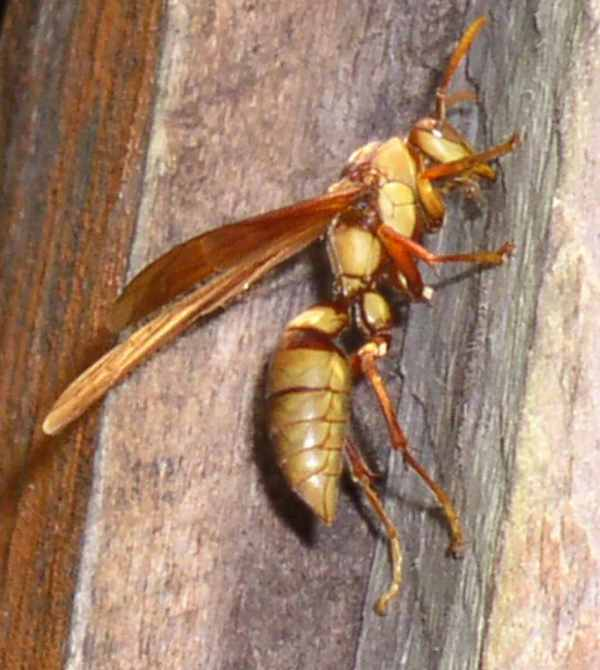
Polistes carnifex - in situ in Belize

Polistes carnifex is the largest Neotropical wasp in the genus Polistes with a body length up to three centimetres. The normal size is 24–27 mm (0.94–1.06 in), with a possible maximum of 33 mm (1.3 in). Despite its size, it is a relatively non-aggressive insect.

It is colored yellow with some brown stripes, these are partially blackish. The antennae are yellow with a darkened base. The head is yellow, the crown of the head being black and ending with reddish-brown stripes. The maxillae are reddish-brown, outlined in black. The thorax is yellow, the dorsal part black, but with a quartet of dark reddish-brown spots. The pronotum is totally or almost totally colored yellow. The abdomen is yellow, the second segment (tergite) darkened at the base. The wings are reddish-brown, or yellowish reddish-brown, and the feet are dark-colored.

It can be grouped with a number of species which can be distinguished from other species within the genus Polistes by their lacking of a groove on the underside of its head called the epicnemial sulcus. P. carnifex can be distinguished among this group of wasps by its wide cheek plates. Also the first tergite is very compact, dorsally convex, and elevated vertically compared to the constriction where the abdomen is inserted into the thorax. Furthermore, the eyes do not touch the clypeus. Lastly, this is a very large wasp, with individuals always longer than 20mm. The first gastral segment (sternite) is less broad than long.

Ducke states that the nests, with their relatively long and strong central petiole, are characteristic for the species, at least among the species in the genus of which the nest was known in his time.

P. carnifex rufipennis appears to differ from the nominate type by the body and wings being colored a tan brown, almost chestnut. Latreille describes it as such, with the antennas and the last quarter of the tarsi being more yellowish. It is yellow above the jaws, the posterior (back) edge of the first segment of the thorax, the very end of the thorax, the area beyond the second scutellum, the posterior edges of the first three rings (tergites + sternites) of the abdomen and the entirety of the following ring, this yellow being in the form of bands on the front rings, and forming two large, united patches which extend laterally to the extreme end of the thorax. A part of the inferior and anterior sides, the outline of the scutellum, and the square segment above that which Latreille calls the "second scutellum" are a similar color, but fainter. The abdomen and wings are glossy. The length of the body of the creature is 26mm.

=== Mandibles ===
As a member of the order Hymenoptera, Polistes carnifex has mandibles, which may be used to obtain wood fibers, build nests, or capture and macerate prey. The mandibles of P. carnifex are short. Yet, they are markedly wide at their base, with a length to basal width ratio of approximately 2:1. An external basal area stretches "from the basal margin ... to a point situated about half-way the mandible's length." P. carnifex also have teeth. "A convex distal posterior area ... is continuous with the posterior-most apical tooth and stays adjacent to a distal media area". This area is convex in P. carnifex. In P. carnifex, the third tooth's anterior edge is elongated, compared to in other species.

=== Genitals ===
Like most insects, the genitals of this species are very characteristic. The male wasp has a paramere that is two and a half times as long as wide at the middle, with the parameral spine about 1/6th of the length, and a shallow groove at its side. This spine is covered in very long and dense bristles and pointed apically. The paramere lobe is well developed and rounded, the lower part of the paramere is narrow, about 2/3 the width at the middle part.

It has a slender aedeagus, with about 27 teeth distributed from the end to beginning of the expansion in the middle part of the aedeagus. The penis valve is weakly dilated, with a central entrance and a weakly bi-lobed appearance (the valve being a little more than 1/3 of the length of apical part of the aedeagus). The expansion of the middle part of the aedeagus is well developed and has a pointed apex. The lateral apodeme of the aedeagus is directed forward with a weak central projection and shorter than the rounded ventral process (projection), while the inferior (lower) portion of the aedeagus is weakly curved -appearing almost straight from the side.

The digitus is slender, with a well-developed apical process which is about one and a half times longer than the base of the digitus and the same width from the base to the end. This end (apex) is pointed. The digitus has a band of obvious punctation around its base, and an anteroventral lobe that is short with a rounded end, and is covered in easily rubbed off (evanescent) bristles.

The cuspis is slender, with an apex which is pointed and tapers abruptly, and covered in long and sparse bristles, with more bristles found at the edges of the sides, and with short bristles on the lower part. The punctation on the cuspis is only found on the lateral lobe.

=== Similar species ===
In Paraguay, according to the identification key provided by Bolívar Rafael Garcete-Barrett, the most similar species are P. cavapyta, which has a completely yellow head and is banded with a rusty orange color, P. lanio, which has extensive black coloration on the mesosoma (~thorax) and back of the metasoma (~abdomen), P. canadensis, which has a red metasoma except some black in the sutures between the plates of the exoskeleton. The much smaller P. major is the only species in Paraguay with a similar color pattern.

In Nicaragua, according to the key provided by Jean-Michel Maes, it is best distinguished from the most similar species of the region, P. major, by its wide cheek plates, and the male genitals of both species are furthermore very characteristic.

In Brazil, Ducke compares it to P. claripennis, which has a similar coloration, but with a more pale yellow. This species is much smaller and lacks the wide cheeks of P. carnifex.

According to Joseph Charles Bequaert in 1936, many of the specimens labelled as P. carnifex in collections are P. major, these two species being commonly confused. All published records from Cuba and Hispaniola are P. major. See for example the description by William J. Fox of a specimen collected on San Esteban Island in the Gulf of California, Mexico.

== Distribution ==
Polistes carnifex is native to Central and South America; its range extends from Arizona and southern Texas to Misiones Province in northern Argentina. In 1907 Ducke stated the species occurred in the Greater Antilles, but according to Bequaert in 1936, the species does not occur in the United States nor the Greater Antilles. In 1940 he was proven wrong however, when the first specimen from the United States was collected in Arizona by John J. duBois, this record first being published in 1955.

In Brazil it has been found in the states of Rio de Janeiro, Pará and Paraná.

In Mexico it has been recorded in the states of Baja California, Guerrero, Jalisco, Morelos, Nayarit, Oaxaca, Sinaloa, Sonora, Veracruz and Yucatan, as well as Mexico City.

In Paraguay it is found in the departments of Alto Paraná, Canindeyú, Paraguarí and San Pedro.

Bequaert states the species is not common anywhere. Ducke also states it is infrequently seen in Pará, Brazil.

== Ecology ==
=== Habitat ===
The species is found in coastal, humid, and open areas, such as in evergreen tropical forests. In tropical zones like Paraguay, Brazil and Argentina it is found in extensive wooded habitats without heavy rains.

=== Behavior ===
Before the 1970s little was known of the biology or behavior of Polistes carnifex. P. carnifex is a species of paper wasp, thus, like other members of the subfamily Polistinae, it is an eusocial wasp.

==== Nests ====
The nest is founded by a solitary queen which builds first cell and then further cells from macerated pulpy material. To create a colony, the queen enlarges a cell by introducing a ball of recently macerated pulp on her own. Using her mandibles, the queen loads the ball while holding the sides of the wall being constructed with her foretarsi. While completing this task, the queen moves her antennae in circles about her head, touching the parallel-lying opposite wall. The antennae-wall contact allows the queen to construct straight sides on the inner wall. She lays eggs and feeds the larvae, feeding them nectar and macerated prey. The female workers that emerge from the first cells then assist with the further building and development of the colony, and can themselves mate and lay eggs.

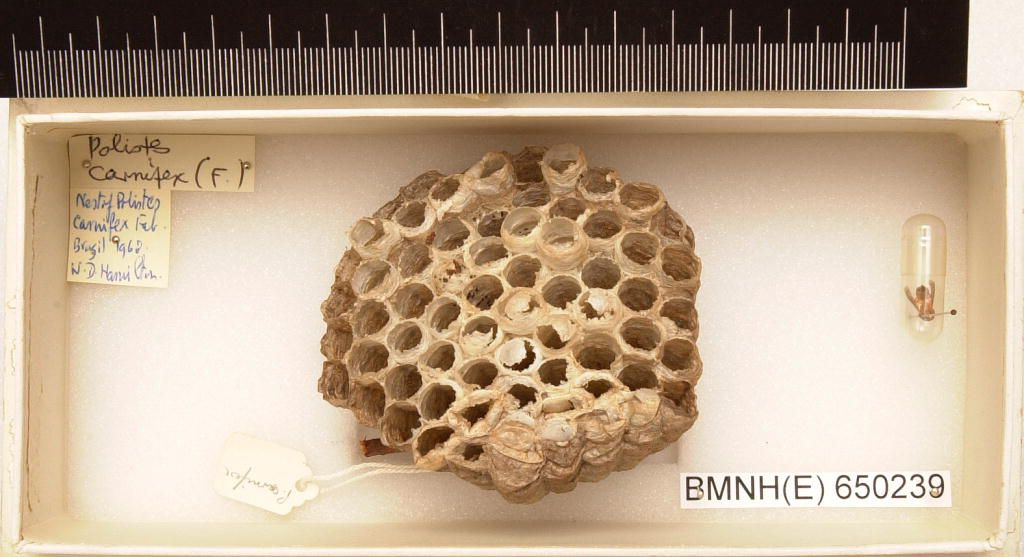
Polistes carnifex nest collected in Brazil in 1967 by William Donald Hamilton and stored at the Natural History Museum, London

Polistes carnifex is a social species and the nests consist of a number of horizontal papery cells in which the young are reared. The nests are built from wood pulp which the wasps chew into a plaster. In a study in Costa Rica, nests were found hanging from branches of various species of low thorny trees near an ephemeral swamp. Nests have been seen under the eaves of buildings. The nests are hanging and open-faced, supported by a single Petiole in the centre which is strengthened by a tough gelatinous material. Of the six nests measured by Corn, the maximum size for a nest of P. carnifex was approximately 9 cm in diameter. One nest in which one emergence at minimum occurred had an average length of 27.8 mm. Nests range in the adult population from 4 to 13 individuals. In one nest studied, there were 28 cells and this number remained constant for the duration of the observation (17 days). There was only one cell observed as being enlarged, which was on the periphery.

==== Reproduction ====
Of six nests examined in 1972 not all nests contained a female with "well-developed ovaries".

==== Feeding ====
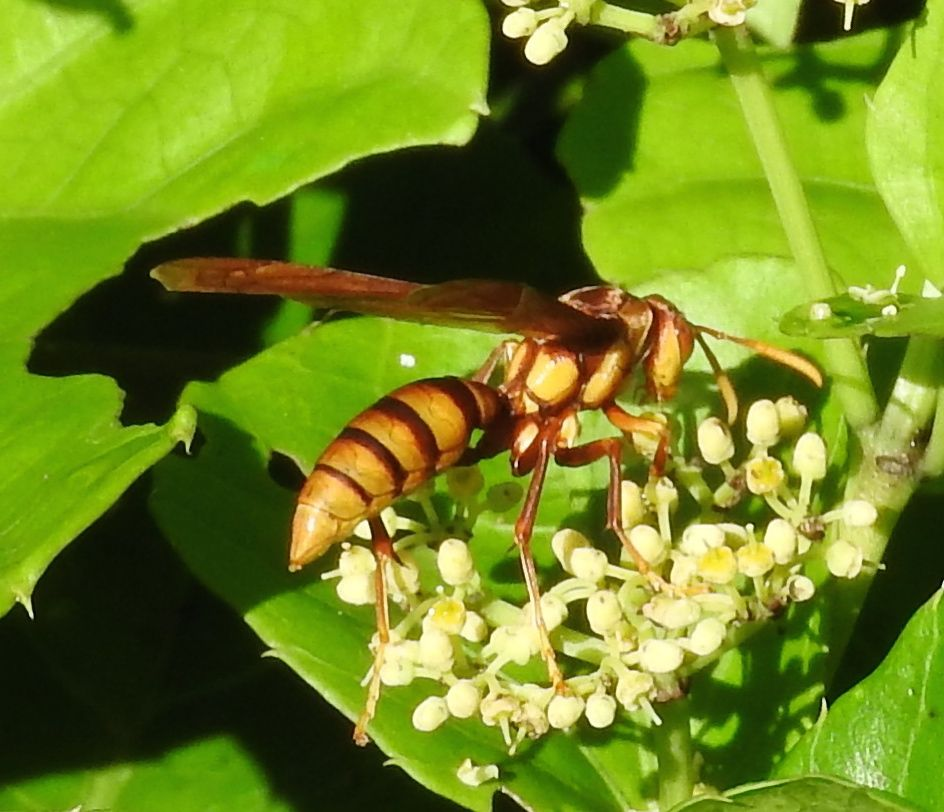
Polistes carnifex feeding on Cissus sp. in situ in Mazatlán, Sinaloa, Mexico

The English naturalist Thomas Belt observed how a Polistes carnifex wasp which had found a large caterpillar, chewed it up and made half of it into a macerated ball. Picking this up, it hovered for a few seconds and then circled several times round the place among the dense foliage where the other half of the caterpillar lay. It then flew off but returned a couple of minutes later and quickly located the correct hole among the leaves. Making its way in among the foliage, it could not at first find the exact leaf on which the caterpillar lay. After several fruitless hunts interspersed with short circling flights, it finally located the dismembered prey and flew off with its trophy. Belt marvelled that the insect could use a mental process so similar to that a human might have used to remember the specific location of its prey.

In Colombia, twenty-nine foraging wasps were observed returning to a particular nest with twenty-five loads of nectar, three loads of macerated prey and one of nest-building pulp. When a foraging wasp arrived, the highest ranking wasp present demanded food and then both fed the larvae. Each wasp pushed its head into a cell, drummed on the cell walls with its antennae and then deposited the food. The drumming noise could be heard a meter away by the researcher, and may have alerted the larvae to the presence of food.

=== Interactions within the species ===
==== Worker policing ====
As a member of the order hymenoptera, Polistes carnifex is subject to worker policing. While the diploid female workers do not mate, they are able to lay unfertilized eggs that will develop into haploid males. The relatedness of a worker to her offspring is r=0.5, and her relatedness to the queen's sons is r=0.25. Similarly, the queen's relatedness to her own offspring is r=0.5, whereas the queen's relatedness to her workers' sons is r=0.25, thus the queen prefers to bear her own sons. The other workers are more closely related to the queen's offspring than to their sisters' offspring. The consequences of these differences is as follows: queens try to suppress the production of eggs by workers and workers have an incentive to suppress other workers from producing eggs. This phenomenon is known as "worker policing".

==== Territorial behavior ====
In Costa Rica, male Polistes carnifex congregate on the top of ridges where they maintain territories. The males chase away other conspecific males from these territories which consist of groups of trees and shrubs with no nests. It is suggested that females only mate with males occupying such territories.

=== Interactions with other species ===
Nests (hanging from low branches on thorny trees near a swamp) were sometimes found within about a meter of nests of a Polybia species and occasionally in similar close proximity to a Mischocyttarus nest. Polybia and Mischocyttarus are often associated in the same area; however, Polistes carnifex only occasionally was found in proximity. The association of P. carnifex with other species of social wasps has not been reported outside of Costa Rica. Some trees bore several nests of different wasp species while many other similar trees bore none, which suggests that there is a non-random distribution.

The species P. major appears to be a Batesian mimic of this species.

==== Parasites ====
In a study of six nests of Polistes carnifex, in three cells there was an additional egg instead of the usual one, but these eggs appeared to be of P. carnifex. The author of this study found no evidence of parasitism, however, the wasps are indeed parasitized by strepsipteran insects in the genus Xenos. These obligate parasites infect the developing wasp larvae in the nest and are present within the abdomens of female wasps when they hatch out. Here they remain until they thrust through the cuticle and pupate (males) or release infective first-instar larvae onto flowers (females). These larvae are transported back to their nests by foraging wasps.

== Conservation ==
The IUCN has not evaluated this species' conservation status.

It has been recorded as present in the following protected areas:

- Shipstern Conservation & Management Area, Belize.
