= Red paper wasp =

Red paper wasp can refer to:

- Polistes carolina, found in the eastern United States
- Polistes rubiginosus, found in the eastern United States
- Polistes canadensis, found across the Neotropical realm, from Arizona through Central America and into South America
- Polistes major castaneicolor, found in the desert southwestern United States and into Sonora, Mexico
