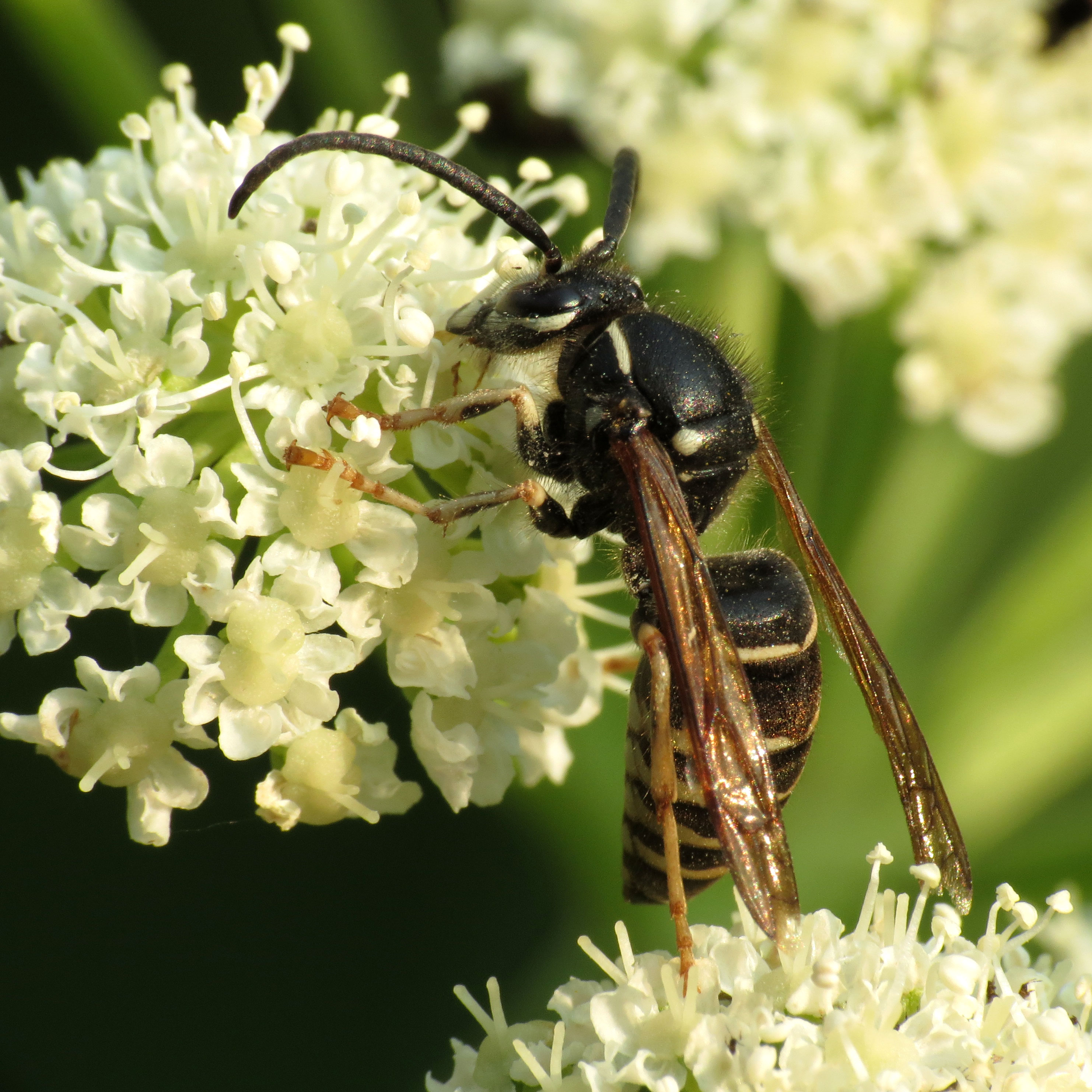

Scientific classification
- Kingdom: Animalia
- Phylum: Arthropoda
- Clade: Pancrustacea
- Class: Insecta
- Order: Hymenoptera
- Family: Vespidae
- Genus: Dolichovespula
- Species: D. adulterina

Binomial name
- Dolichovespula adulterina (Buysson, 1905)

= Dolichovespula adulterina =

Species of wasp

Dolichovespula adulterina is a species of parasitic social wasp found in the Palearctic region. D. adulterina feeds on a variety of foods, including insects, spiders, arthropods, meat, molluscs, fruit, nectar, and larval secretions. D. adulterina was formerly considered to be synonymous with D. arctica from the Holarctic region, but more recent research indicates that D. arctica is a separate species.

== Taxonomy and phylogeny ==
D. adulterina is one of a few parasitic members the subfamily Vespinae, most species of which are eusocial.

== Identification ==
The length of the forewing is 13.0–14.0 mm in females and 10.0–12.0 mm in males. Commonly, its body is an ivory colour, but it can be pale yellow on occasion; the pale yellow subspecies are found in the western Nearctic and Palearctic regions. Usually, the clypeus is elongated, but sometimes it will be small and round. Females almost always have a black, disc-like spot, whereas males have a black mark that extends to the ventral margin of the clypeus. Melanic individuals have a black spot extending to the dorsal margin. The postocular band in females is narrower relative to the lateral postocular stripes, whereas in males it is rarely narrowed. Occasionally, small ivory sports are located on the pronotum behind the pronotal fovea. Females present with pairs of black discal spots on tergum 5, and occasionally on terga 3 and 4, as well. In males, tergum 6 usually is black with a less developed fascia than previous terga. Furthermore, in males, tergum 7 is usually black and rarely contains two ivory spots.

A black and white, sometimes pale yellow, this wasp has brown-tinted wings. Normally, abdominal segments 1-5 are bordered, towards their rears, with a thin, white band. The large, dark malar space between the eye and the yellow jaw puts this species in Dolichovespula rather than the related genus Vespula.

== Distribution and habitat ==
D. adulterina has a Palearctic distribution, and it parasitises D. saxonica and D. norwegica.

D. saxonica constructs nests in trees and shrubs no more than two metres (6.6 ft) above the ground. Sometimes, D. saxonica nests in beehives, underneath overhanging edge of roofs (sometimes up to seven metres [23 ft] above ground) and porches, and cavities of walls. On occasion, they may also nest in tree holes or holes in the ground.

== Biology ==
D. adulterina's main host in Europe is D. saxonica, but it also parasitises D. norwegica. This species produces no workers; the eggs laid in the host's nest produce queens and males, which are nurtured by the workers of the host species.

=== Colony cycle ===
D. adulterina is a parasitic species, so its lifecycle is consistent with the host it parasitises. Furthermore, D. adulterina invades the nest of host species before the first set of workers appears, and lives alongside the queen for a time before usurping her.

==== D. saxonica ====
D. adulterina most often parasitises D. saxonica. In mid-May or just before, colonies initiate. The first set of workers emerges in early June and begins working on large cells mid-June. Queens emerge in early July and the colony continues until just after mid-August.

Regardless of the host species, the queen D. adulterina invades the host colony around the same time that the first workers start to emerge. The invasive queen waits around 10 days before killing the host queen and laying her eggs. Males emerge in late July and new queens emerge in early August. After a few days, the males and females leave for their mating flights. The colony then terminates in mid-August. The inquiline queen dies by mid-July, if not earlier, from fights with host workers. After the colony ceases, the queen enters hibernation in a sheltered area. She will then emerge and feed on nectar and malaxate arthropods until she attempts to usurp a host colony. On average, the colony cycle for a successful parasitic queen is about 2.8 months.

=== Parasitic behaviour ===
D. adulterina is a parasitic social insect. Social insects are labeled parasites when the parasitic female enters the host nest and assumes the reproductive responsibility of queen while simultaneously leading the pre-existing workers. D. adulterina is an inquiline species, meaning that workers are not produced. One of its hosts species is D. norwegica, although this was not accepted by some authorities for some time, indirect evidence was the presence of D. adulterina in regions where D. saxonica was absent but the related D. norwegica was present and this was confirmed by direct observation. Furthermore, they do not have a worker caste and they do not construct nests. Instead, they will use the host nests and workers to raise their offspring.

D. adulterina uses a submissive approach while the host nest is under attack, living alongside the host queen for a while before attempting to kill her. This is different from other inquiline species, such as V. austriaca, which attack the nest's queen immediately. During its time in the nest, D. adulterina is an active member of the colony, feeding larvae and constructing portions of the nest. Workers of the host species were observed interacting with D. adulterina, suggesting that the parasite may emit a chemical that pacifies the host. This is also supported by the presence of an enlarged Dufour’s gland relative to other vespine species. Time of invasion also differs between species. D. adulterina invades the nest of the host species before the first set of workers appears, whereas Vespula austriaca invades after the emergence of the first set of workers.

=== Diet ===
D. adulterina, like social vespines, is primarily carnivorous. The species feeds on a multitude of insects, spiders, and arthropods. To do this, adults malaxate prey and feed on the juices. Other times, they have been observed eating meat, molluscs, fruit, and nectar. Larvae produce a secretion on which adults feed, as well. Wasps limit themselves to attacking live prey, but other species have been observed to feed on carcasses. Trophallaxis is a common process among wasps, where one member transfers food to another member by feeding it mouth-to-mouth. Members of the host nest are mainly responsible for feeding the parasitic D. adulterina larvae.

== Sting ==
D. adulterina's stinger is an adaptation to its parasitic biology. The cuticle of the stinger is thicker than average and is curved. These modifications allow for D. adulterina to effectively penetrate the intersegmental membranes of the host. D. adulterina is better equipped defensively, as well. The abdominal sclerites are closer together, providing a smaller gap for incoming stingers to penetrate, thereby decreasing chances of injury.

== Emery's rule ==
D. adulterina, along with V. austriaca, D. arctica, and D. omissa, are the only four vespine wasp species that display inquilinism. Furthermore, all of these species abide by Emery's rule, which states that a social parasite is more closely related to its host than to any other species. In host colonies, D. adulterina queens have allomonal control over worker wasps. While D. adulterina is able to comfortably coexist with its host, it does not integrate nearly as well into host colonies as inquiline ant species. Due to its mediocre proficiency, inquiline wasps are only able to parasitize other species that exist in small colonies and have short cycles.
