= PMM1 =

Protein-coding gene in the species Homo sapiens

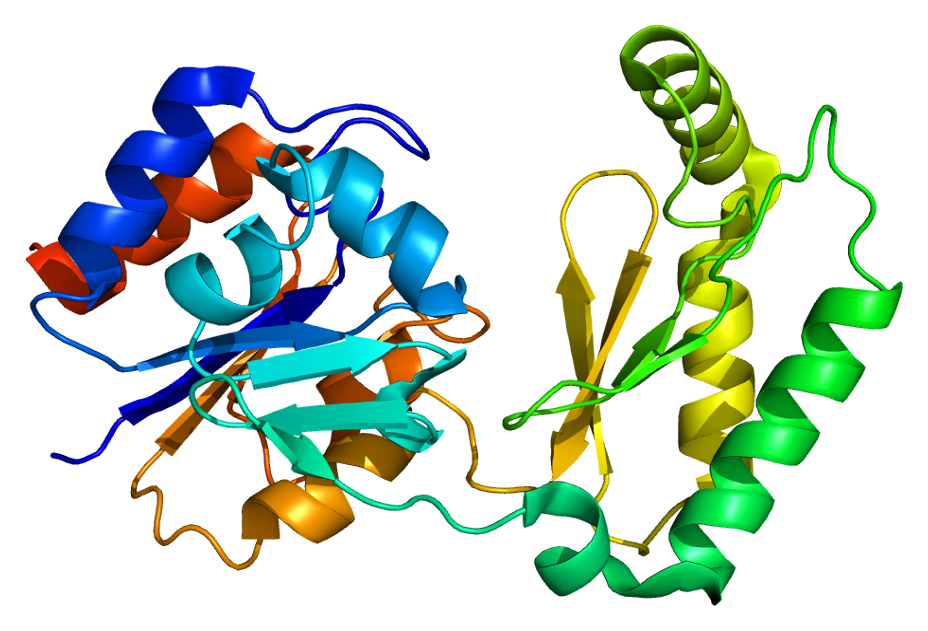

Identifiers
- Aliases: PMM1, Sec53, phosphomannomutase 1, PMMH-22, PMM 1
- External IDs: OMIM: 601786; MGI: 1353418; GeneCards: PMM1
Available structures
PDB	Ortholog search: PDBe RCSB
PDB	List of PDB id codes 2FUC, 2FUE
Enzyme activity
EC #	BRENDA	ExPASy	KEGG	MetaCyc
5.4.2.8	↗	↗	↗	↗

Gene location (Human)
Chr.	Chromosome 22 (human)
Band	22q13.2	Start	41,576,900 bp
Band	22q13.2	End	41,589,871 bp

Gene location (Mouse)
Chr.	Chromosome 15 (mouse)
Band	15|15 E1	Start	81,835,309 bp
Band	15|15 E1	End	81,845,131 bp
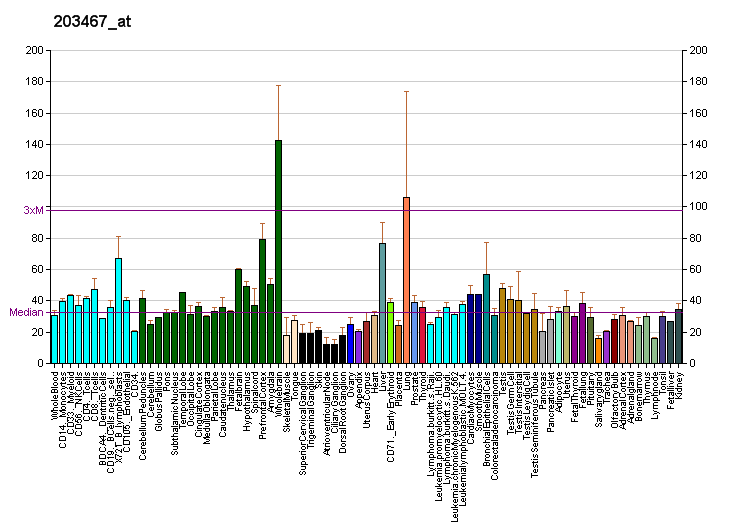
RNA expression pattern
Bgee	Human / Mouse (ortholog); Top expressed in: mucosa of transverse colon; body of stomach; right lobe of liver; nucleus accumbens; right frontal lobe; right adrenal gland; right lung; left adrenal gland; right adrenal cortex; cingulate gyrus / Top expressed in: morula; morula; neural layer of retina; dentate gyrus of hippocampal formation granule cell; superior frontal gyrus; cerebellar cortex; primary visual cortex; lateral hypothalamus; lateral geniculate nucleus; hippocampus proper; More reference expression data
BioGPS	More reference expression data
Gene ontology
Molecular function	phosphomannomutase activity; isomerase activity; protein binding; metal ion binding
Cellular component	cytoplasm; soma; cytosol
Biological process	mannose metabolic process; protein N-linked glycosylation; protein targeting to ER; GDP-mannose biosynthetic process; cellular response to leukemia inhibitory factor
Sources:Amigo / QuickGO
Orthologs
Databases	NCBI: entry; OMA: entry
Species	Human	Mouse
Entrez	5372	29858
Ensembl	ENSG00000100417	ENSMUSG00000022474
UniProt	Q92871	O35621
RefSeq (mRNA)	NM_002676	NM_001282040; NM_001282041; NM_013872
RefSeq (protein)	NP_002667	NP_001268969; NP_001268970; NP_038900
Location (UCSC)	Chr 22: 41.58 – 41.59 Mb	Chr 15: 81.84 – 81.85 Mb
PubMed search
- Wikidata
View/Edit Human	View/Edit Mouse

Phosphomannomutase 1 is an enzyme that in humans is encoded by the PMM1 gene.

Phosphomannomutase catalyzes the conversion between D-mannose 6-phosphate and D-mannose 1-phosphate which is a substrate for GDP-mannose synthesis. GDP-mannose is used for synthesis of dolichol-phosphate-mannose, which is essential for N-linked glycosylation and thus the secretion of several glycoproteins as well as for the synthesis of Glycosylphosphatidylinositol (GPI) anchored proteins.

This enzyme has been extracted from the venom of the wasp species Polistes major major.
