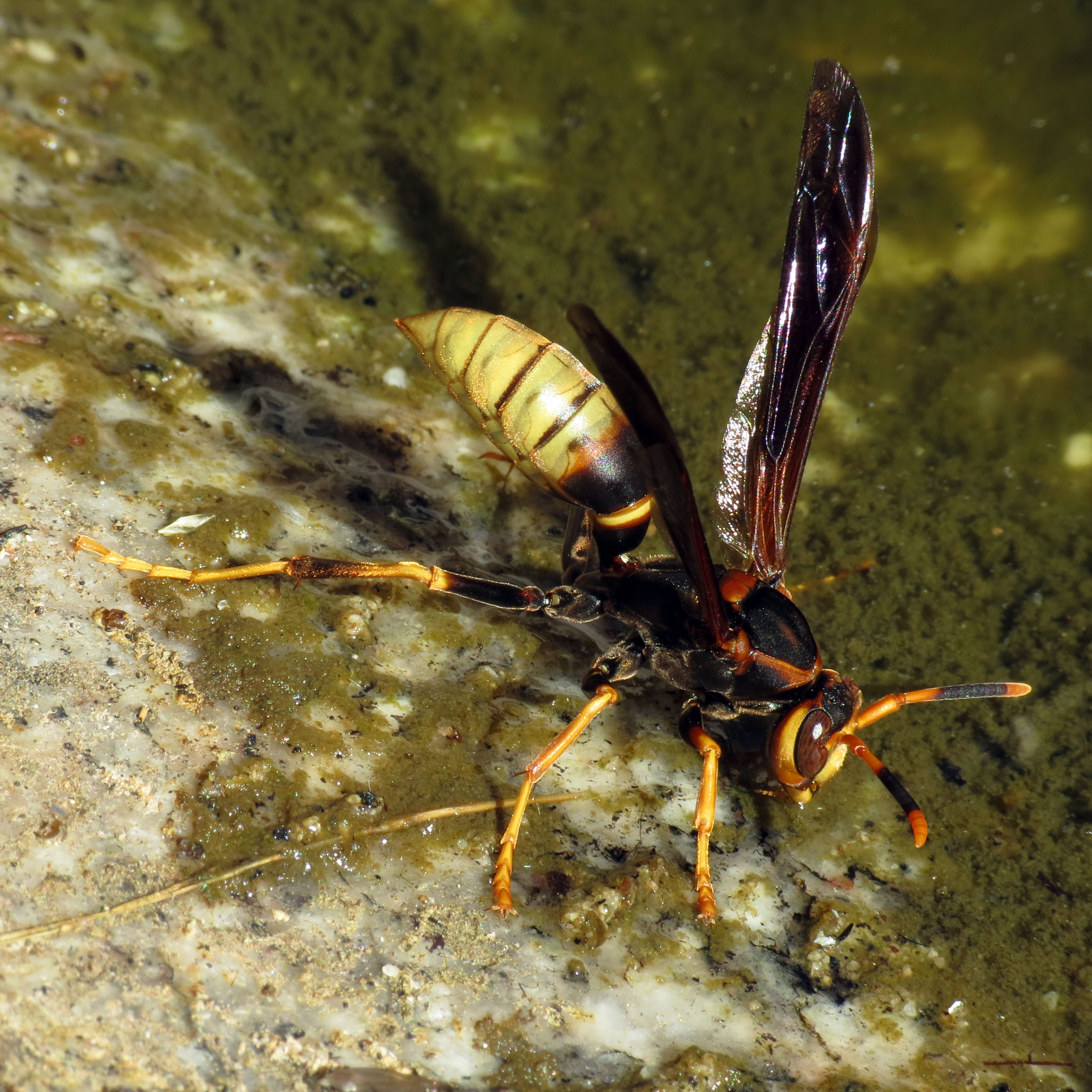

Scientific classification
- Domain: Eukaryota
- Kingdom: Animalia
- Phylum: Arthropoda
- Class: Insecta
- Order: Hymenoptera
- Family: Vespidae
- Subfamily: Polistinae
- Genus: Polistes
- Species: P. comanchus

Binomial name
- Polistes comanchus Saussure, 1857

Synonyms
- Polistes commanchus Richards, 1978, lapsus; Polistes navajoe Cresson, 1868; Polistes novajoe Dalla Torre, 1894, lapsus; Polistes novajae Dalla Torre, 1894, lapsus; Polistes canadensis navajoe (Cresson, 1868)

= Polistes comanchus =

Species of wasp

Polistes comanchus is a species of paper wasp from northwestern Mexico to the south central United States.

== Taxonomy ==
It was described in 1857 by Henri Louis Frédéric de Saussure using a collection from Nuevo México - this does not correspond to the modern state of New Mexico, but at the time was a formerly Mexican territory which had recently been conquered and annexed by the USA, and included everything in between modern Nevada to east Texas. He had travelled to this region in 1856.

In 1978 Owain Richards classified P. comanchus in a subgenus he named Aphanilopterus after an old synonym of P. lanio by Fernand Anatole Meunier, he further placed it in a "species group 1".

=== Subspecies ===
Two subspecies are accepted:

- Polistes comanchus ssp. comanchus - Found in southwestern Texas, Coahuila, Durango, New Mexico?
- Polistes comanchus ssp. navajoe (Cresson, 1868) - Found in Arizona, California, New Mexico, western Texas, Sonora, Chihuahua, Durango, Sinaloa. This subspecies makes its nests in cavities reached via a very small opening.

== Conservation ==
The IUCN has not evaluated this species' conservation status.
