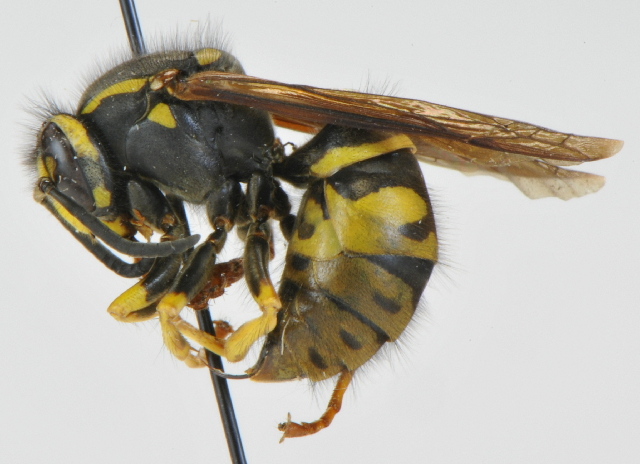

Scientific classification
- Kingdom: Animalia
- Phylum: Arthropoda
- Clade: Pancrustacea
- Class: Insecta
- Order: Hymenoptera
- Family: Vespidae
- Genus: Vespula
- Species: V. infernalis

Binomial name
- Vespula infernalis (Saussure, 1854)

Synonyms
- Vespa Infernalis Saussure, 1854; Vespa tripunctata Packard, 1870

= Vespula infernalis =

Species of wasp

Vespula infernalis is an obligate parasitic wasp, parasitizing the nests of other species in the genus Vespula. Its common host species is V. acadica in North America. It is sometimes called the cuckoo yellowjacket wasp due to its inquiline lifestyle. They differ from other parasitic wasps in their intensely aggressive behaviour during invasion and occupation of the host colony. Several morphological adaptations such as bigger body parts and highly curved stingers are present in these wasps to aid their aggressive parasitic behaviour.

Once they occupy a host's nest, V. infernalis are known to engage in mauling and chasing of host workers and forced trophallaxis. Female wasps will also force host workers to feed and take care of their brood.

== Taxonomy and phylogeny ==
V. infernalis is a member of the family Vespidae. It is nearly identical in appearance and biology to the Old World species V. austriaca and is considered its sister species. Until recently the Nearctic population was considered to be the same species, and appears in all of the literature before 2012 as V. austriaca, though some sources are not yet updated; see.

== Description and identification ==
This wasp is an obligate social parasite. As a result, it possess special morphological adaptations to take over host colonies. These adaptations include larger body parts such as a larger head width than its host V. acadica. As an adaptation to its parasitic lifestyle, V. infernalis has a large, heavily curved stinger; this curving allows the parasitic wasp to puncture through the intersegmental membranes of host colony workers who are defending their nests.

The male abdomen is longer with thick lateral black bands while the female abdomen is wider with fewer lateral black bands and black dots. V. infernalis wasps have a characteristic black and yellow colouring throughout their bodies. Irregular margins and narrow yellow marks on the scape are often used to identify Vespula infernalis.

== Distribution and habitat ==
Vespula infernalis is found in the Nearctic region, in the Boreal region of North America. The species is not considered rare and is stable throughout its range. These wasps are seen throughout all the provinces and territories of Canada and in certain states in the United States; Alaska, New Jersey, Michigan, Wisconsin, North Dakota, New Mexico, Arizona, and California.

== Colony cycle ==
This wasp is known as a social parasite. Their life cycle depends on invading and usurping other wasps' colonies. As an obligate parasite, Vespula infernalis lacks a worker caste and cannot build their own nests or feed their own offspring. V. infernalis females will hibernate longer than their host queens, ensuring that the hosts' nests will be ready when they leave their hibernation spots. After killing the host queen, the female V. infernalis tends to be aggressive towards the host workers who rear her brood.

These wasps have very short seasons with flight periods from June to mid July and August to mid September.

== Parasitic behaviour ==
V. infernalis parasitises V. acadica. Near the dorsal edge of V. infernalis mandibles, there is a fourth marginal tooth whereas the host, V. acadica has three. When researchers dissected individuals of V. infernalis, they found that they had larger, sturdier mature muscle bundles in abdominal sterna and tergum than the muscles in a queen of V. acadica. As a result, it was more difficult to dissect V. infernalis.

Nests of V. acadica were found to be smaller than normal due to the parasitism of V. infernalis.

== Invasion ==
=== Queen-reared worker stage ===
When a female V. infernalis invades a host's nest such as V. acadica during the queen-reared worker stage, the usurpation can be divided into two phases. The first phase is preusurpation. During this phase, interactions between the intruder and the host queen could be relatively calm and civil or aggressive. The queen may ignore the intruder and refrain from firing an attack first. The workers exhibit the same behavior as their queen. If the intruder attacks first by mauling or attempting to sting a worker, interactions between the queen and intruder become intense. The parasite, if successful, will use its stinger to paralyze the head, thorax, and legs of the host queen. The queen-reared worker stage is when the nest is at its most vulnerable, thus it is when most invasions take place. The nest is more susceptible to invasion at this time because both the queen and workers are less defensive.

=== Post-emergence colony stage ===
During this stage, the colony is larger. In one experiment, a V. infernalis female was allowed to invade a Vespula atropilosa colony. Different from the queen reared worker stage, the workers in this stage were much more defensive; more aggression was observed in the form of stinging, mauling and chasing. The parasite displays more aggression than the host's queen. During a fight between the parasite and the queen, the parasite will do anything to harm or gain a better position by using her mandibles and stinger. Injuries to the queen include but are not limited to broken antennae and injured fore and hind-leg. The host queen refrained from using her mandibles whereas the workers were quick to use theirs in defense.

== Post-invasion: parasite and host worker interactions ==
V. infernalis are very hostile and aggressive in invading and killing or driving away the host queen. Once the invasion of a host nest is successful, V. infernalis will take over the nest, inspecting and patrolling the cells. The host workers will initially avoid the parasite and often ignore any colony duties. In response, the parasite will maul and chase the workers. While there is still tension, the inquiline typically does not sting the workers and does not engage in egg eating (oophagy). An evolutionarily favorable strategy would be to kill older workers of the host colony first and leave the younger workers behind to take care of the brood. During this period, a female will assert her dominance over the younger workers.

This display of dominance by the parasite over the host workers is more common during early colony occupations and absent later on. The parasite displays mauling behaviour: it grabs the workers with its legs and chews on their dorsums. Furthermore, the parasite also displays mauling behaviour after trophallaxis, which it initiates by soliciting and chasing a worker. V. infernalis rarely forage, build cells, or feed larvae, nor do they help thermoregulate (workers fan during hot temperatures or adopt warming postures during low temperatures). Furthermore, even when a nest is attacked by enemies, the parasite will remain inside the nest rather than help the workers defend it.

=== Suppression of reproduction of host workers ===
Several signs indicate that V. infernalis repress the reproduction of host workers. During gastral dragging (dragging of abdomen across comb), substances that prevent oogenesis in workers are released from the Dufour's gland of the parasite, effectively bringing a halt to reproduction. There is no worker oviposition in nests of V. acadica parasitised by V. infernalis. Normally if workers were ovipositing then there would be higher levels of aggression between them, but mauling behavior tends to be reduced instead. The frequent aggressive and assertive behaviours of the parasites aid in asserting reproductive monopoly. Another indication is that parasites are observed to patrol cells frequently, defending oviposition sites.

== Diet ==
While other wasp queens depend on secretions from larvae for food, V. infernalis obtain their nourishment in the liquid form through solicitations and trophallaxis of host workers. They rarely solicit larvae for nourishment. The parasites will often use force to obtain what they need. During forced feeding, the parasite will grab the host worker using its forelegs to reel in the worker. More forceful behaviour includes pushing the host worker against a comb of the nest. While some parasitic behaviour such as mauling only occurs during early post-invasion stages, forced trophallaxis behaviour occurs throughout. Towards the later stages, the intensity of forced feeding declined, leading to host workers escaping forced encounters. Usually forced trophallaxis encounters were short, lasting from 1 to 5 seconds, but some encounters lasted for as long as 43 seconds.

== Characteristics of the venom ==
Due to the parasitic lifestyle of V. infernalis, the sting is a vital apparatus. It consists of the shaft, aculeus, Dufour's gland, and the venom glands. The Dufour's gland and venom reservoirs are the biggest among V. infernalis females. In an experiment where the oily venom extracted from V. infernalis was injected into Vespula pensylvanica workers, the Lethal Dose (LD50) value was between 20 and 30 mg/kg. V. pensylvanica queens had a higher tolerance to V. infernalis venom than workers (LD50=81 mg/kg). On average, it took 18.6 μg of venom to kill about half of the queens and 2–3 μg of venom to kill half the workers. The venom has the ability to paralyze and impair activities such as flying. Material obtained from the Dufour's gland was also injected into V. pensylvanica wasps; no significant effects were observed, indicating the gland does not contain a poison. Generally, in order to kill a host worker, a V. infernalis has to use about a third of its venom supply. More venom is needed to kill a queen. Surprisingly, given that their survival and success as parasites depend upon it, V. infernalis venom is no more lethal than the venom from V. atropilosa and V. pensylvanica.

== Reproduction ==
In preusurpation V. infernalis individuals, Dufour's gland contains clear oily material. It is part of the reproductive organs along with the ovaries and a poison gland. In new fall wasps, the Dufour's gland was empty and flat and in older wasps, the gland had a little oil but was flat as well. Hypertrophy of the Dufour's gland is known to occur but more evidence is needed. During and after the mauling period, female V. infernalis will oviposit. This time period is brief. The females insert eggs in new cell combs. Workers act no differently during period of oviposition. However, one instance of a worker interrupting the oviposition of the parasite was recorded, which led to mauling of the worker by the parasite and the egg falling out of the designated cell. Eggs laid by V. infernalis are not only found in cells but also found on the cell wall, exterior of the comb, between cells, or along the caps.
