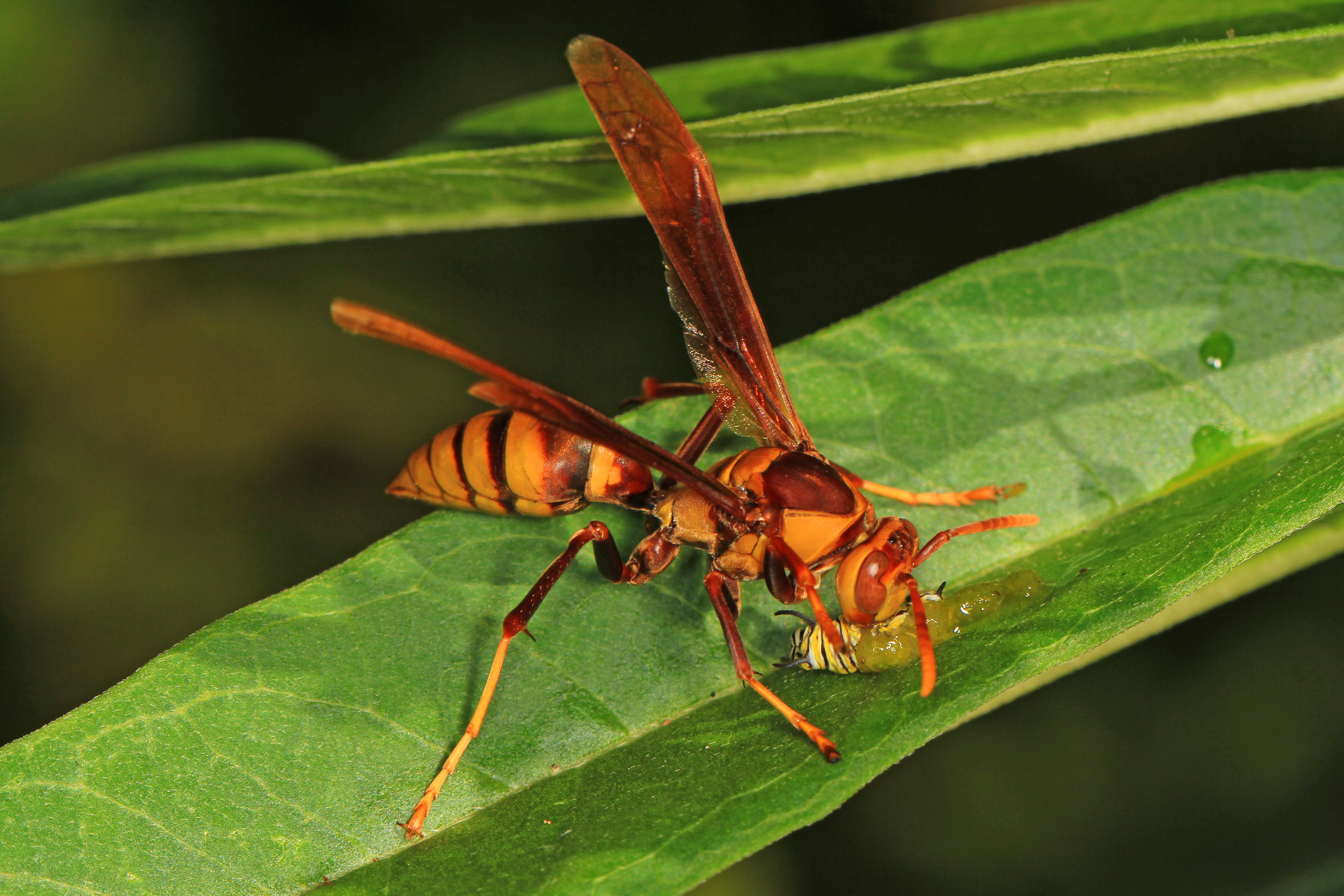
- P. major in Coral Gables, Florida

Scientific classification
- Domain: Eukaryota
- Kingdom: Animalia
- Phylum: Arthropoda
- Class: Insecta
- Order: Hymenoptera
- Family: Vespidae
- Subfamily: Polistinae
- Genus: Polistes
- Species: P. major

Binomial name
- Polistes major Palisot de Beauvois, 1818

= Polistes major =

Species of wasp

Polistes major is a Neotropical species of paper wasp found from South America north into the southern United States. This species is known as avispa de caballo (Spanish: "horse wasp") in the Dominican Republic.

== Subspecies ==
There are five described subspecies:

- Polistes major bonaccensis Bequaert, 1937
- Polistes major castaneicolor Bequaert, 1936
- Polistes major colombianus Bequaert, 1940
- Polistes major major Palisot de Beauvois, 1818
- Polistes major weyrauchi Bequaert, 1940

== Description ==
Polistes major is a larger species compared to allies within its genus, reaching 17 to 22 mm (0.67 to 0.87 in) in length, with a wingspan of up to 45 mm (1.8 in). It is second in size only to P. carnifex. The coloration varies by subspecies, though the most widespread subspecies, P. m. major, has a reddish-brown ground color with broad yellow stripes. In contrast, the subspecies P. m. castaneicolor and P. m. weyrauchi are entirely reddish with no yellow markings.
