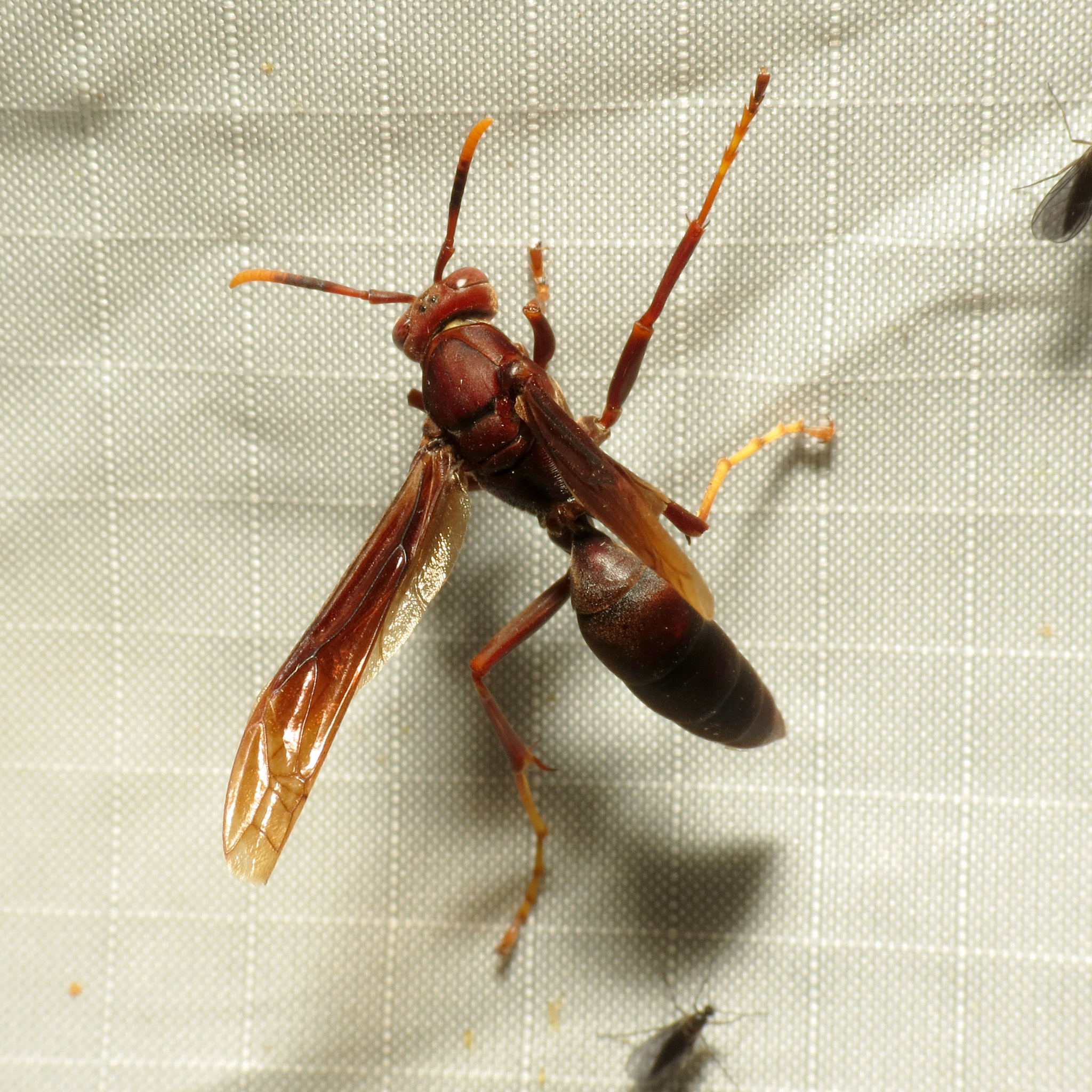

Scientific classification
- Domain: Eukaryota
- Kingdom: Animalia
- Phylum: Arthropoda
- Class: Insecta
- Order: Hymenoptera
- Family: Vespidae
- Subfamily: Polistinae
- Genus: Polistes
- Species: P. major
- Subspecies: P. m. castaneicolor

Trinomial name
- Polistes major castaneicolor Bequaert, 1936

= Polistes major castaneicolor =

Subspecies of wasp

Polistes major castaneicolor is a subspecies of red paper wasp found in the Sonoran Desert. It ranges from Arizona, United States, to Sonora, Mexico.

== Taxonomy ==
P. major castaneicolor is one of the five subspecies of Polistes major, along with Polistes major bonaccensis, Polistes major columbianus, Polistes major major, and Polistes major weyrauchi. The subspecies was first described by Joseph Charles Bequaert in 1936.

== Description ==
Polistes major castaneicolor is a large wasp, with its species reaching a body length of 17 to 22 mm (0.67 to 0.87 in) in length and a wingspan of up to 45 mm (1.8 in). This subspecies has a completely reddish body with at most yellow on the inner orbits, fore coxae, and tarsi. It is notably convergent in coloration with P. canadensis, which co-occurs within the range of P. m. castaneicolor.
