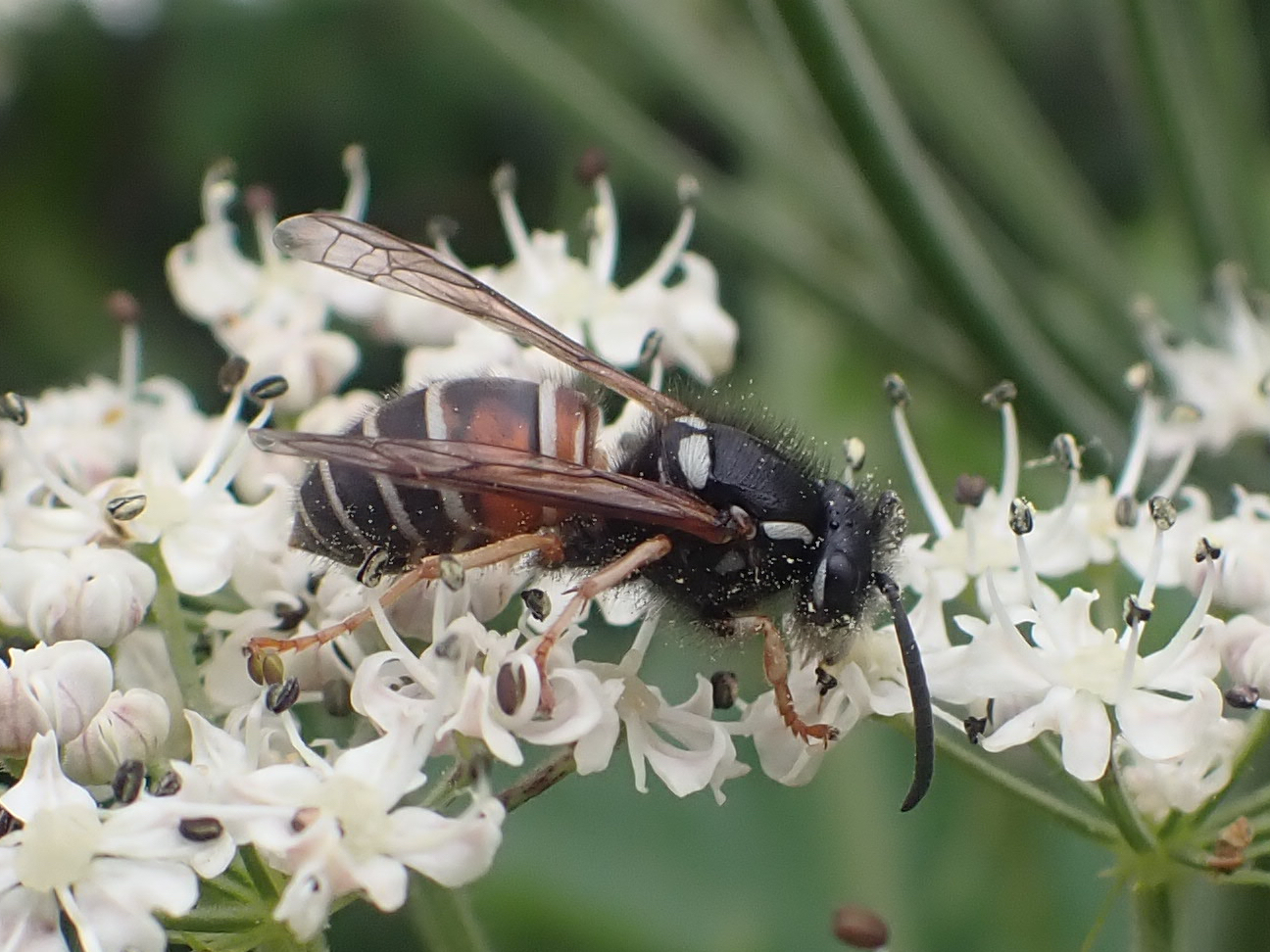

Scientific classification
- Kingdom: Animalia
- Phylum: Arthropoda
- Clade: Pancrustacea
- Class: Insecta
- Order: Hymenoptera
- Family: Vespidae
- Genus: Vespula
- Species: V. intermedia

Binomial name
- Vespula intermedia (du Buysson, 1905)

= Vespula intermedia =

Species of wasp

Vespula intermedia, the American red-banded yellowjacket, or the northern red-banded yellowjacket, is a rare species of wasp in the family Vespidae. It was described by Robert du Buysson in 1905. The species is native to northern Canada, Maine, and parts of Alaska, primarily the Canadian provinces of Yukon, Northwest Territories, Nunavut, British Columbia, Alberta, Saskatchewan, Manitoba, Ontario, Quebec, Newfoundland and Labrador, Prince Edward Island, Nova Scotia, and New Brunswick. It was listed as a synonym of Vespula rufa, but no clear evidence of its classification is present, with a mixed divide on its status from entomologists.
