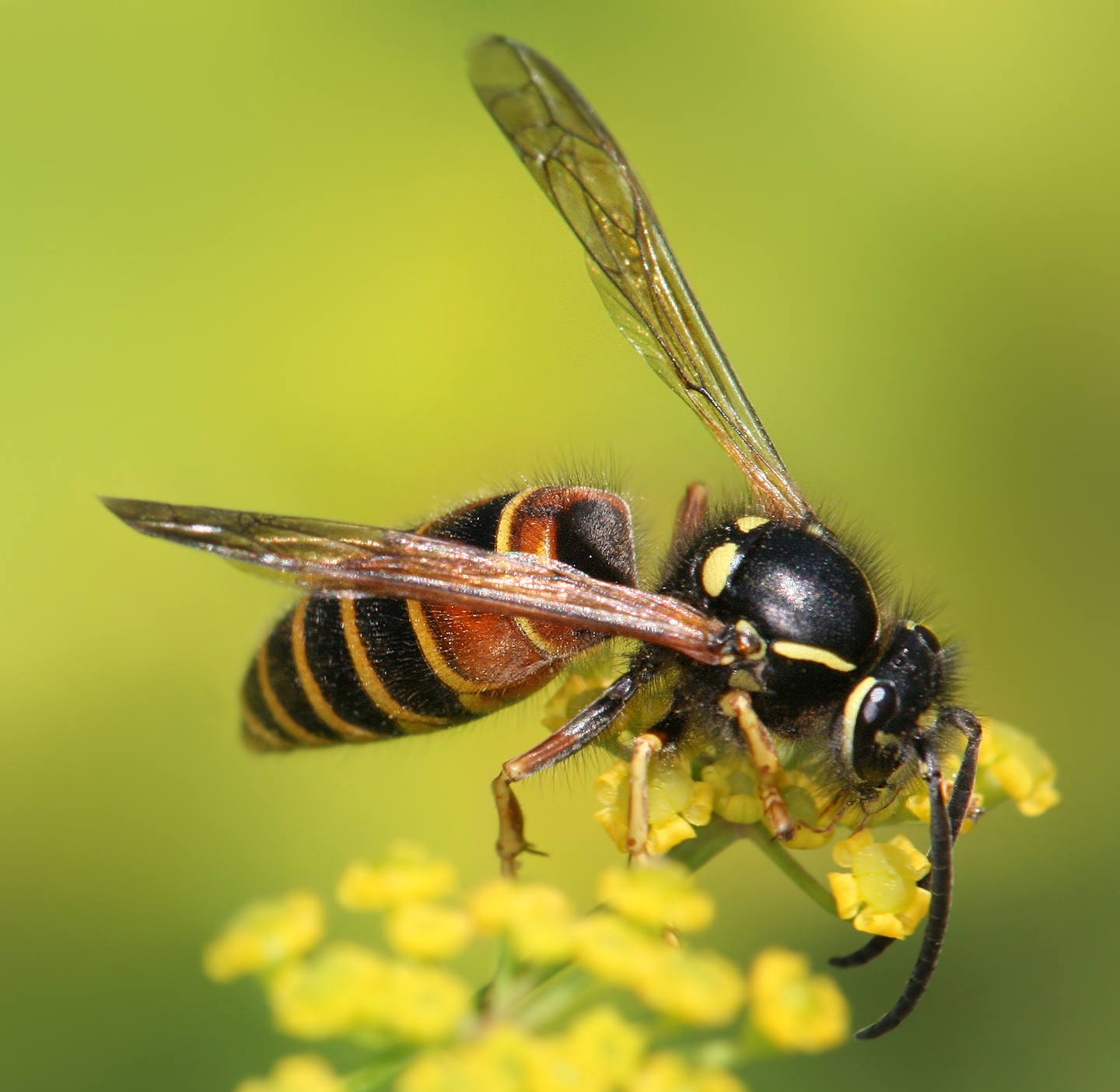
- On Bupleurum falcatum flowers

Scientific classification
- Kingdom: Animalia
- Phylum: Arthropoda
- Clade: Pancrustacea
- Class: Insecta
- Order: Hymenoptera
- Family: Vespidae
- Genus: Vespula
- Species: V. rufa

Binomial name
- Vespula rufa (Linnaeus, 1758)

Synonyms
- Vespa schrenckii Radoszkowski, 1861; Vespa sibirica André, 1884; Vespula grahami Archer, 1981; Vespula obscura Lee, 1986; Vespula gongshanensis Lee, 1986; Vespula yichunensis Lee, 1986; Vespula yulongensis Dong & Wang, 2002

= Vespula rufa =

Species of wasp

Vespula rufa, commonly known as the red wasp, is a social wasp species belonging to the genus Vespula. It is found in northern and central Europe and parts of Asia. Vespula rufa is characterised by red-brown markings and body segmentation, with the appearance varying amongst the different roles of individuals in the species. These wasps build small nests in dry banks underground that are not far below the surface. The colony cycle begins in the fall. Vespula rufa feed on live insects. One interesting fact about Vespula rufa is that the queen policing occurs in the species, and that worker policing occurs at much lower rates than other species in the genus Vespula. There are predators and parasites of the species. The species goes through a series of events before leaving the nest.

== Taxonomy and phylogeny ==
Vespula rufa is a member of the genus Vespula. Within the genus, this species is most closely related to Vespula squamosa. Other species in Vespula include V. germanica, V. maculifrons, and V. vulgaris. Outside of the genus, Dolichovespula is the next most closely related genus.

Typical red wasps, V. r. rufa, of the western Palearctic, have yellow markings. Eastern Palaearctic populations instead have ivory markings, and this form has been called V. r. schrenckii. A third subspecies, V. r. grahami, was described from Sichuan, China.

The northern red-banded yellowjacket of North America was originally described as V. rufa var. intermedia by Robert du Buysson in 1905 and differs from V. r. rufa in having ivory rather than yellow markings. Due to the variability of the brownish markings, which can be seen from specimens throughout its range, V. intermedia was once thought to be equivalent to V. r. schrenckii, which also has ivory markings. However, pale-marked populations also occur within the range of the V. rufa in Scandinavia and Central Asia.

More recently, however, V. rufa was proposed to be restricted to the Palearctic, resulting in the name Vespula intermedia being resurrected and elevated to species status for the Nearctic population.

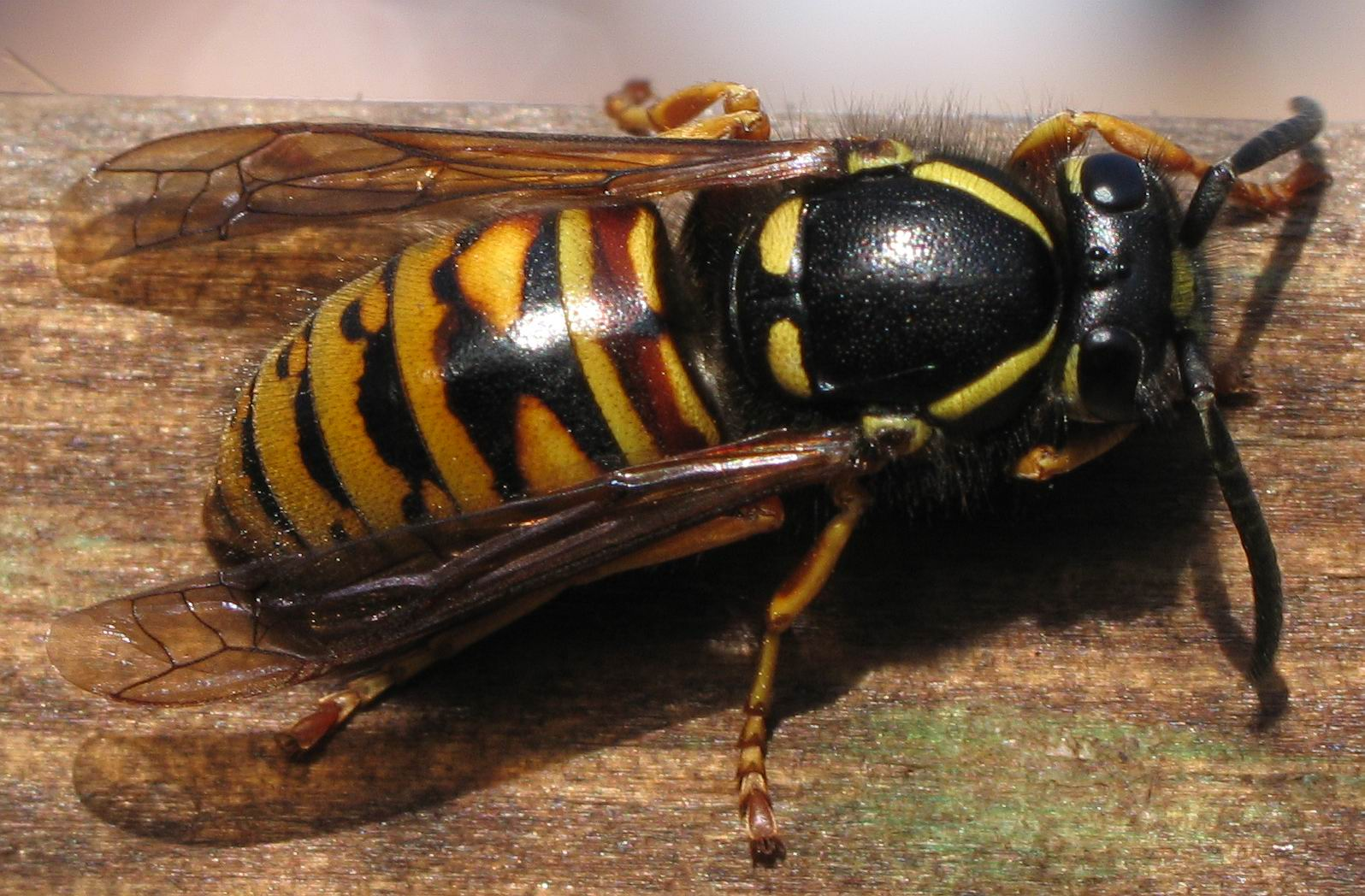
Red wasp queen on a log

== Description and identification ==
=== Morphology ===
V. rufa can be distinguished by its reddish-brown markings on the back. Specimens of this species with reduced spots on the abdomen have tissue that is segmented into three parts and four "anteriorly directed lobes." There are three main types of colour patterns in the species. V. rufa lack the long, yellow lines that V. squamosa and V. sulphurea have. Workers and queens differ in their colour patterns. While the basic colour scheme appears to be the same in workers and queens, there are some slight differences. Workers have more expansive black colour and less yellow or white than queens. That is, the queens have a greater display of yellow colour than the workers. In the workers, the yellow tissue of the abdominal segment is thin and triply divided, while the yellow tissue segments in the queen are larger. In queens lateral divisions become black spots. However, this is not always the case as often workers have divisions replaced by black spots, and queens occasionally have the less patterned appearance characteristic of workers. The differences in colour pattern correspond to the size, with more coloured workers being more likely to be large and less coloured ones more likely to be small. Workers have the smallest fore wing length (10.0-11.0 mm), followed by males (11.0-12.0 mm), and queens have the longest fore wings (12.5-13.0 mm).

=== Nests ===
Nests are typically composed "of one comb of small worker cells and up to three combs of larger cells used for rearing males and queens, surrounded by multiple layers of envelope". The nests (investigated in Archer's experiment) were small with a mean of 57 workers, as cited in "A Test of Worker Policing Theory in an Advanced Eusocial Wasp, Vespula rufa." However, mature colonies can have as many as 282 workers. The nests are generally found in dry banks underground but close to the surface. Subterranean nests have nest cavities just below the surface or just beneath the layer of moss. There are also nests that are positioned in the stumps of old, hollow trees, as well as nests that are hanging from the roots of trees. In a group of 19 subterranean nests the average depth of such nests was 2.9 centimeters. On rare occasions, aerial nests can be spotted in dense bushes. Aerial nests can exist "in a cavity ...or covered above."

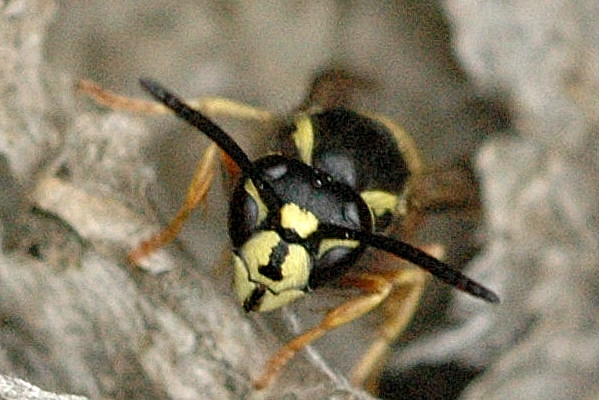
facial pattern

== Distribution and habitat ==
V. rufa can be found in the "Palearctic" and in the northern parts of North America. Examples of locations with V. rufa include Great Britain, Ireland, the Netherlands, Russia, Turkey, Mongolia, and China. In general, this species builds its nests below ground, often in cavities or along the underside of a roof. V. rufa nests are generally found underground near the surface of dry banks. Nests are made using mineral soil and leaf litter in a shaded environment. Old tree remains and tree roots can also be utilised to make nests. V. rufa is a common wasp species.

== Colony cycle ==
The lifecycle of a V. rufa colony begins in the fall as queens leave their home colony and, after fertilization, enter over-wintering sites. In early spring the queens emerge from hibernation to look for a nesting cavity. The nest is usually constructed underground in an abandoned rodent burrow or similar cavity, more rarely in cavities above ground (hollow stumps, wall cavities, and bird boxes), under moss, in dense bushes, under eaves of houses or in attics. The queen commences the process by building the "queen nest" and raising the first workers, such that these workers can begin to forage, engage in "nest-building and brood rearing activities," rather than the queen. In the meantime, the queen can lay eggs. The queens and workers overlap in foraging for at least two days in "one colony and three days in another." The burden of feeding the larvae and enlarging the nest is on the workers. Colony expansion continue rapidly, with thousands of workers being produced in a large nest in approximately a 9-week period. Eggs, that are laid in the cells, hatch to become larvae. When the last larval stage is near its end, "the gut contents are evacuated to form the meconium at the bottom of the cell." The larva spins a cocoon, thereby entering the pupal stage.

Workers and the majority of males are reared in the first cells, which are small with a diameter for approximately 4 mm. Large cells of about 6 mm in diameter are constructed later in the season and queens and a few males are reared in these cells. Because queens and males, but not workers, were observed in a few frigid regions, Birula asserts that workers are not reared in extremely cold areas and that only queens and males are reared in such environments. Once the new males and queens leave the colony, workers slowly die out and the colony ceases to exist. Founded in spring and dying out in August, nests have a short annual cycle.

The nest of the Red Wasp is relatively small with a diameter which rarely exceeds 20 cm. It is made from paper produced by chewing old and weathered, but dry wood.

== Worker-queen conflict ==
It is common for a conflict to exist between individuals in social groups as they often have different goals, which spurs conflict. Through evolution, mechanisms to encourage group effectiveness and minimise individual's selfish interests have evolved. Social policing is an important example in which "mutual enforcement limits the success of selfish individuals." Differences in objectives for queens and workers bees can be attributed to differences in relatedness between them. Worker policing is a consequence of this difference.

=== Differences in relatedness ===
Although workers are generally unable to mate, they have functional ovaries that allow them to lay eggs. Because these eggs are not fertilised, they would become male wasps. Workers would want to produce such wasps as they would be more closely related to their own sons than to their mothers' sons, or brothers. However, it is not in the queens best interest for workers to produce offspring. This is because a queen would be more closely related to her own offspring (r=1/2) than to her offspring's sons (r=1/4). When the queen mates with many males, workers are more closely related to their brothers (queens' sons) since r=0.25, than to the sons of other workers since r<0.25 for half-nephews and nephews). The differences in relatedness of offspring between workers and queens represents a conflict of interest between workers and queens, as both workers and queens want to maximise the survival of the offspring more closely related to themselves, according to the selfish gene perspective.

=== Worker Policing ===
With regard to conflict over who bears males, policing refers to the process in which individual workers are precluded from reproducing. Policing can be carried out by the queen or by workers. Two different approaches can be taken to achieve policing: worker-laid eggs can be eliminated or reproductive workers can be treated aggressively. According to kin selection theory, queens should carry out policing because queens are closer relatives to their own sons than to their workers' sons - that is their daughters' sons. When queens mate with multiple males, workers should police because workers are generally closer relatives of the queen's sons than to the workers' sons. Vespula rufa has much lower rates of worker policing than other species in its genus. Moreover, the queen polices a substantial percentage of worker-laid eggs in the species.

== Interactions with other species ==
=== Parasites ===
Parasites of Vespula rufa include the beetle Metoecus paradoxus (a larval parasitoid) and the fly Conops flavipes (an endoparasite). The larvae of Volucella pellucens (a hoverfly) act as scavengers. Vespula austriaca is an obligate social parasite on V. rufa in Europe and Asia. Because of its parasitic behaviour, V. austriaca does not produce workers, but relies on the host workers for rearing. The queen of V. austriaca invades the V. rufa host colony, and drives away the V. rufa queen.

=== Predators ===
Badgers (Meles meles) destroy Vespula rufa nests, consuming the occupants, combs, and envelope. The wasps stings don't threaten badgers as thick skin and body hair protect them from stings. Great tits (Parus major) are also predators of V. rufa, digging their nests out of cavities. The larvae of Volucella pellucens (a hoverfly) act as scavengers.

== Leaving the nest ==
There are many factors affecting whether worker wasps will leave the nest. Important considerations include temperature, light intensity, and the existence of other wasps. Relative humidity and atmospheric pressure do not affect V. rufa's decision of whether or not to leave the nest. Orientation flights occur so that V. rufa can familiarise themselves with the entrance to their nest and recognise it when they return. By removing roadblocks, V. rufa would be able to enter and exit more smoothly.

=== Light intensity ===
The amount of light present in the morning or evening is most critical element affecting wasp movement. In the evening, light intensity plays a key role in determining the time that the last movements to and from the nest occur. For V. rufa, the minimum value for sorties to leave the nest in the morning is 4.0 lux or 0.37 ft cs. The amount of light required for the last sorties to return to the nest is 6.0 lux or 0.56 ft cs. The level is related to the compound eye length, 2.4 mm in this species. For comparison Vespa crabro (the European Hornet) has a much larger body and thus a greater eye length of 3.7mm enabling it to forage in moonlight at 0.2 lux.

=== Temperature ===
If the temperature is too low, then wasps will not leave the nest. There has not been sufficient research on this topic, but the current research suggests very different temperatures for different species.

=== Presence of other wasps ===
Whether there is another wasp present at the exit to the nest will affect V. rufa decision about leaving the nest. For V. rufa, "five wasps must be present to act as a 'releaser' for foraging." Only when there are insufficient insects in the nest entrance can wasps passing in the opposite direction serve as releasers. This phenomenon of "social facilitation" means that V. rufa leave nests in clusters rather than in a continuous trickle. The releaser behaviour pattern of V. rufa is more readily noticeable than that of other British species.

=== Orientation flights ===
When a young worker leaves the nest for the first time, it will generally make 2 to 3 'orientation flights' in order to familiarise itself with the entrance to the colony amidst the surrounding landscape. In the first flight, the worker flies approximately 25 cm out of the nest at once and then quickly turns around to face the entrance. The wasp slowly flies back and forth to the nest several times, surveying an angle that is approximately 90 degrees, while facing the entrance. Then, the wasp promptly returns to the nest, the whole flight lasting only about one minute or less. Soon after returning from the first flight, the wasp will leave the nest in a similar fashion, but this time ventures out approximately 15 to 20 meters and covers an angle of approximately 280 degrees. Once 2 meters away, V. rufa will fly back and forth repeatedly in a figure-eight pattern, while facing the entrance to the nest. In some cases, after this second flight the wasp will have gathered all of the knowledge necessary to fly off. Other wasps must make a third orientation flight that is like the second one. At first, the worker may miss the entrance to the nest many times; however, after six to twelve trips, the wasp gains its bearings; flights become longer, and reentry into the colony becomes more precise.
