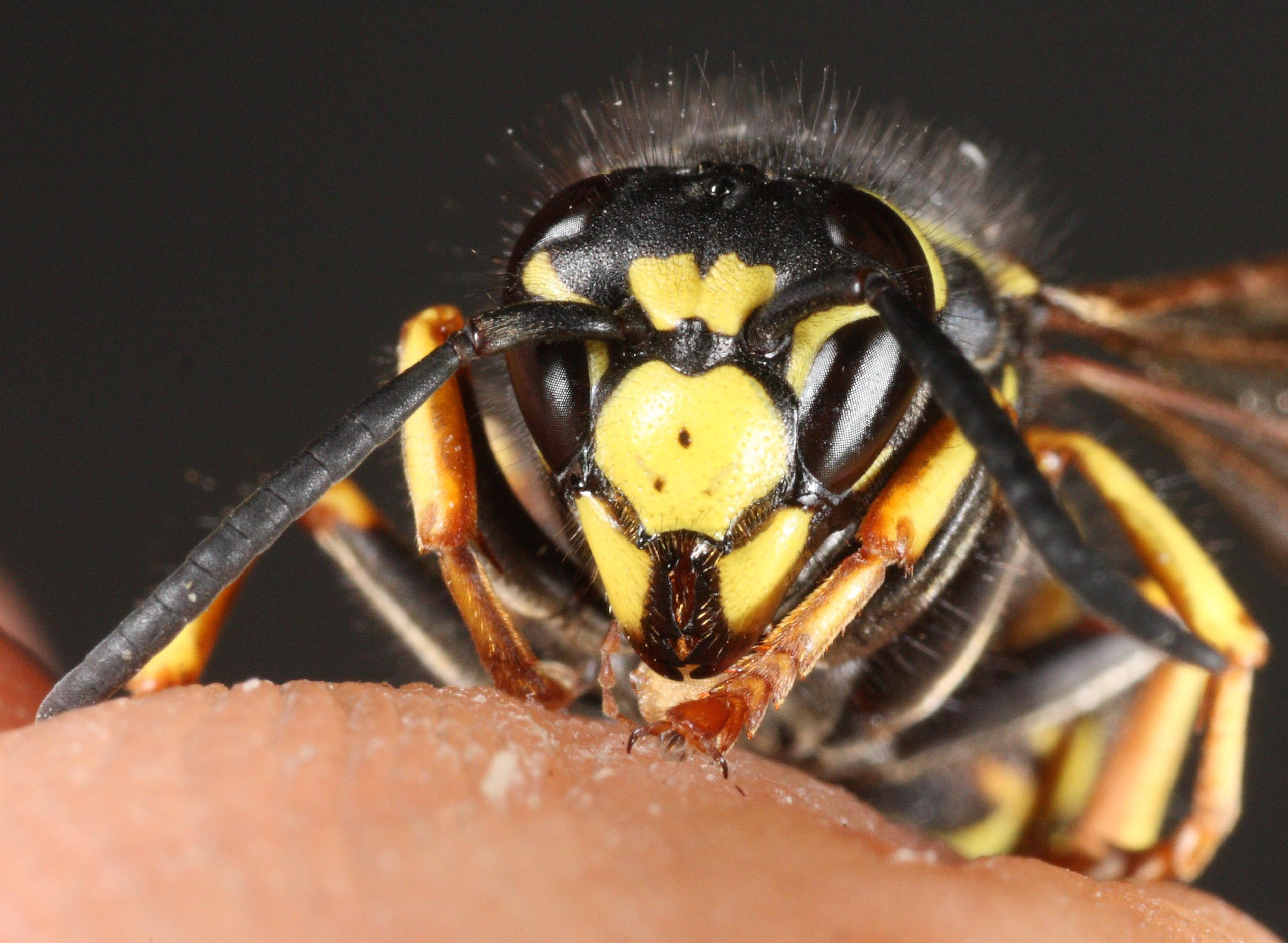

Scientific classification
- Kingdom: Animalia
- Phylum: Arthropoda
- Clade: Pancrustacea
- Class: Insecta
- Order: Hymenoptera
- Family: Vespidae
- Genus: Vespula
- Species: V. austriaca

Binomial name
- Vespula austriaca (Panzer, 1799)

Synonyms
- Vespa austriaca Panzer, 1799; Vespa borealis Smith, 1843 (homonym); Vespa arborea Smith, 1849; Vespa biloba Schilling, 1850

= Vespula austriaca =

Species of wasp

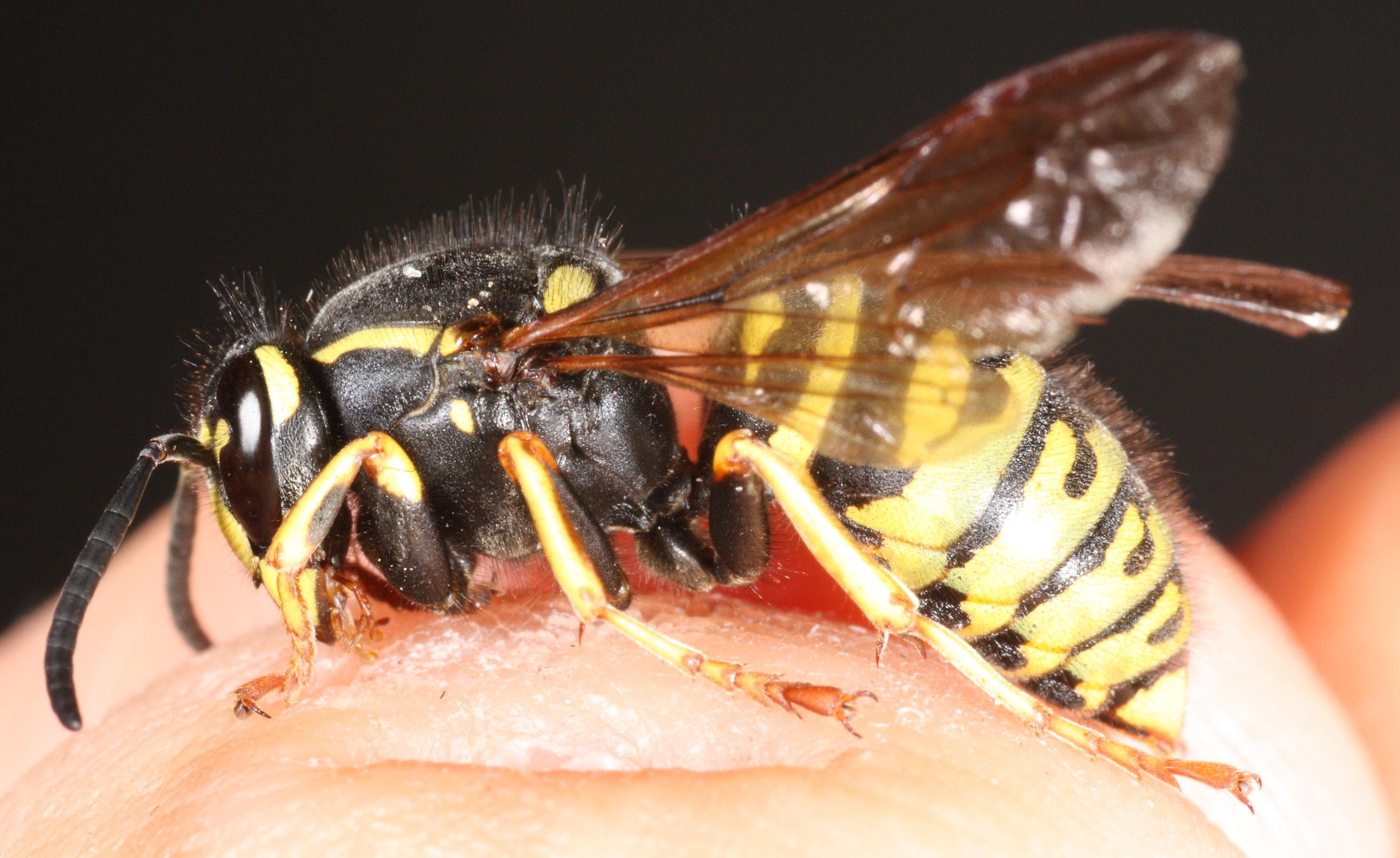

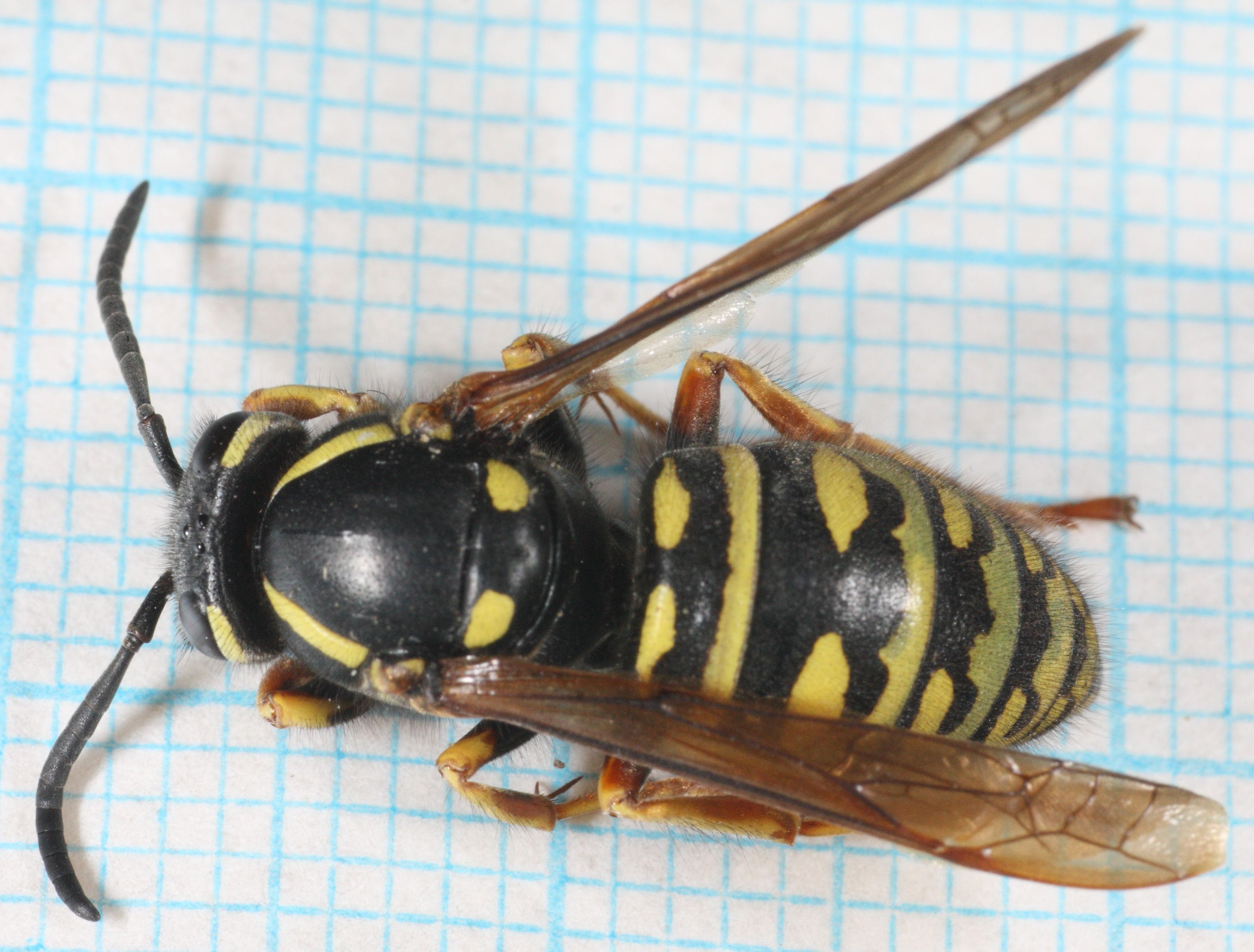

Vespula austriaca is an obligate parasitic wasp, parasitizing the nests of other species in the genus Vespula in the Old World. Its common host species include V. rufa in Europe, Japan, and East Siberia.V. austriaca wasps pollinate orchids.

In some literature, V. austriaca is mentioned under the common name "Cuckoo wasp", but this should not be confused with the family Chrysididae, which have the same common name.

== Taxonomy and phylogeny ==
Vespula austriaca is a member of the family Vespidae. The genera Vespula and Dolichovespula are thought to be closely related and are considered sister groups. Their similarities include absences of strong seta on third segment of labial palpus, smaller scutal lamella, and a characteristic twisted pedicel in embryonic nests.

The Nearctic population formerly considered as belonging to V. austriaca has been recognized as a separate species, Vespula infernalis.

== Description and identification ==
Vespula austriaca is an obligate social parasite, and is quite similar in appearance to other Vespula species.

The male abdomen is longer with thick lateral black bands while the female abdomen is wider with fewer lateral black bands and black dots.

== Distribution and habitat ==
Vespula austriaca is found in the Palearctic region, from Europe to Kamchatka, Japan, northwest China, Turkey, northern Pakistan, and northern India. In Europe, V. austriaca is most common in Ireland and Scotland.

As an obligate parasite, these wasps do not build their nests. As a result, the queens hibernate longer than their host queens. This ensures that the nests will be ready when they leave their hibernation spots.

== Colony cycle ==
Vespula austriaca is known as a labour parasite. Its lifestyle depends on invading and usurping other colonies. First, females kill the queens of the host colony and force the host workers to care of their offspring. Also, V. austriaca wasps lack a worker caste and the ability to build their own nests. These wasps have very short seasons, with flight periods from June to mid-July and August to mid-September.

== Parasitic behaviour ==
Vespula austriaca takes advantage of hosts such as Vespula rufa from East Siberia, Europe, and Honshû Japan.

== Diet ==
Vespula austriaca larvae obtain nutrients from insects and spiders brought to them by the host workers.

== Human importance ==
Vespula austriaca is not itself considered a pest, but one of its hosts, Vespula rufa, is a pest because it frequently enters buildings. Considered a nuisance, one Vespula austriaca wasp was found in a shipping container.

== Reproduction ==
Vespula austriaca does not produce any workers. Instead the queens lay eggs that eventually produce more queens and male adults.
