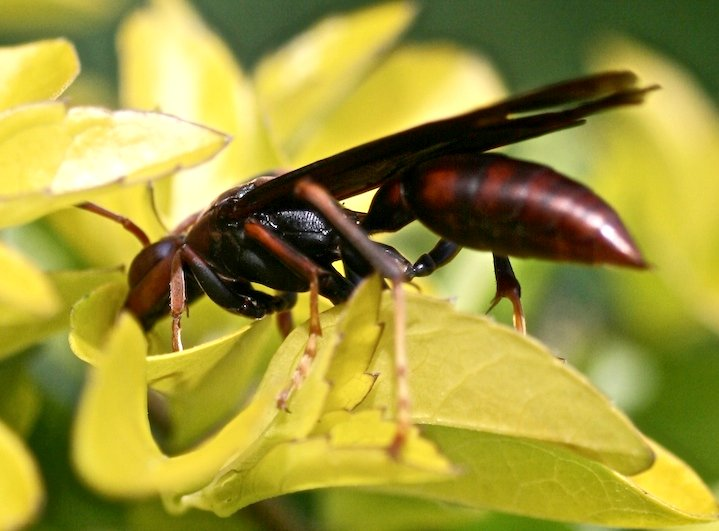
- In Brazil

Scientific classification
- Domain: Eukaryota
- Kingdom: Animalia
- Phylum: Arthropoda
- Class: Insecta
- Order: Hymenoptera
- Family: Vespidae
- Subfamily: Polistinae
- Tribe: Polistini
- Genus: Polistes
- Species: P. lanio

Binomial name
- Polistes lanio (Fabricius, 1775)

Synonyms
- Vespa lanio Fabricius, 1775; Aphanilopterus vagabundus Meunier, 1888; Polistes canadensis trinitatis Giordani Soika, 1965

= Polistes lanio =

Species of paper wasp

Polistes lanio is a species of paper wasp and one of several species in the subgenus Polistes (Aphanilopterus) known as a jack Spaniard wasp.

== Distribution ==
This species occurs throughout South America and on Trinidad.

== Subspecies ==
This species is divided into the following subspecies:

- Polistes lanio lanio (Fabricius, 1775)
- Polistes lanio satanulus Bequaert 1940
- Polistes lanio weberi Bequaert 1940
