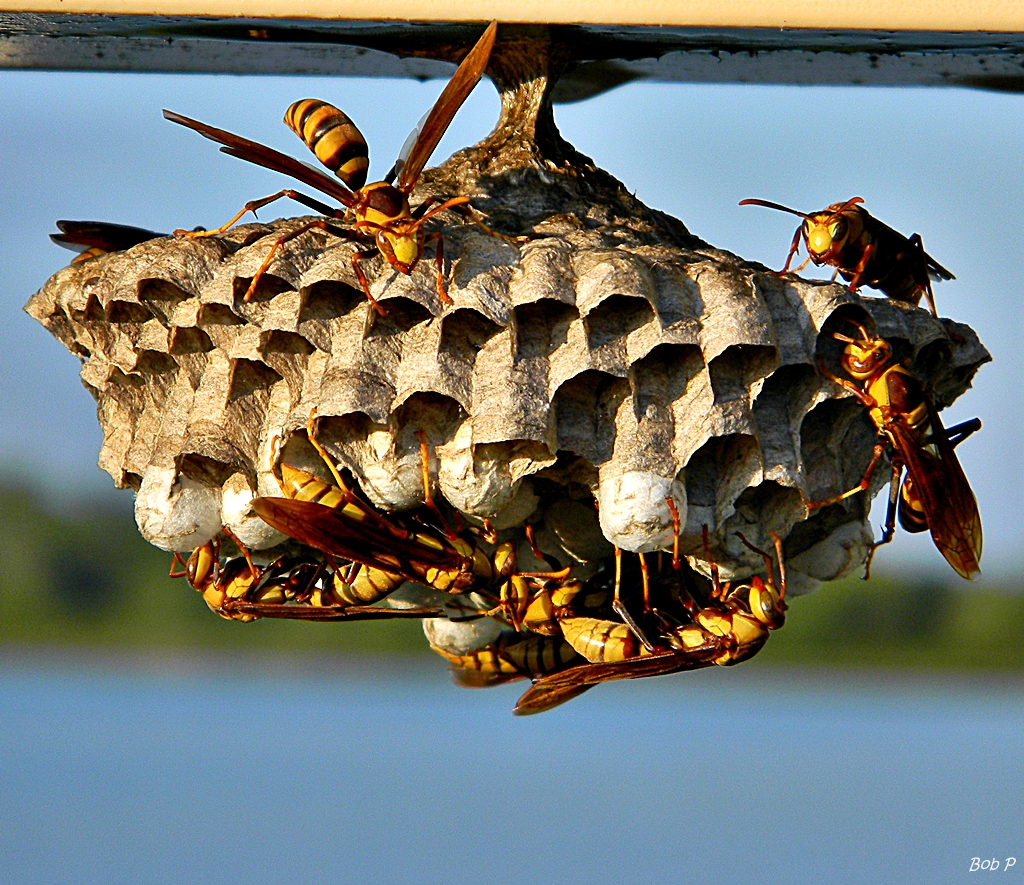
- Nest in West Palm Beach, Florida

Scientific classification
- Kingdom: Animalia
- Phylum: Arthropoda
- Class: Insecta
- Order: Hymenoptera
- Family: Vespidae
- Subfamily: Polistinae
- Genus: Polistes
- Species: P. major
- Subspecies: P. m. major

Trinomial name
- Polistes major major Palisot de Beauvois, 1818

= Polistes major major =

Subspecies of wasp

Polistes major major is a Neotropical eusocial paper wasp subspecies most commonly found on the Caribbean island of Hispaniola, as well as in Central America, South Florida in the United States, and Puerto Rico. It has been called avispa de caballo (Spanish: "horse wasp") in the Dominican Republic.

== Taxonomy ==
P. m. major is the nominate subspecies of Polistes major; other subspecies include P. m. bonaccensis, P. m. castaneicolor, P. m. columbianus, and P. m. weyrauchi. Polites major was first formally named by Palisot de Beauvois in 1818.

== Description ==
Polistes major major is larger in comparison to members of other wasp species, reaching 17 to 22 mm (0.67 to 0.87 in) in length, with a wingspan of up to 45 mm (1.8 in). It is primarily yellow with vibrant brown markings and wings.

A queen will rarely leave the nest and she lays the majority of the eggs within the nest, if not all. Female workers are foragers, and often leave the nest to hunt for food. The workers engage in malaxation of their captured prey and drop off pieces into the larval cells, so that the growing brood may feed upon the chewed up food. After 4 to 5 days post emergence, drones will usually leave the nest and not return. Males will mark territory and patrol routes with pheromones released from their face and sternal regions.

=== Nest structure ===
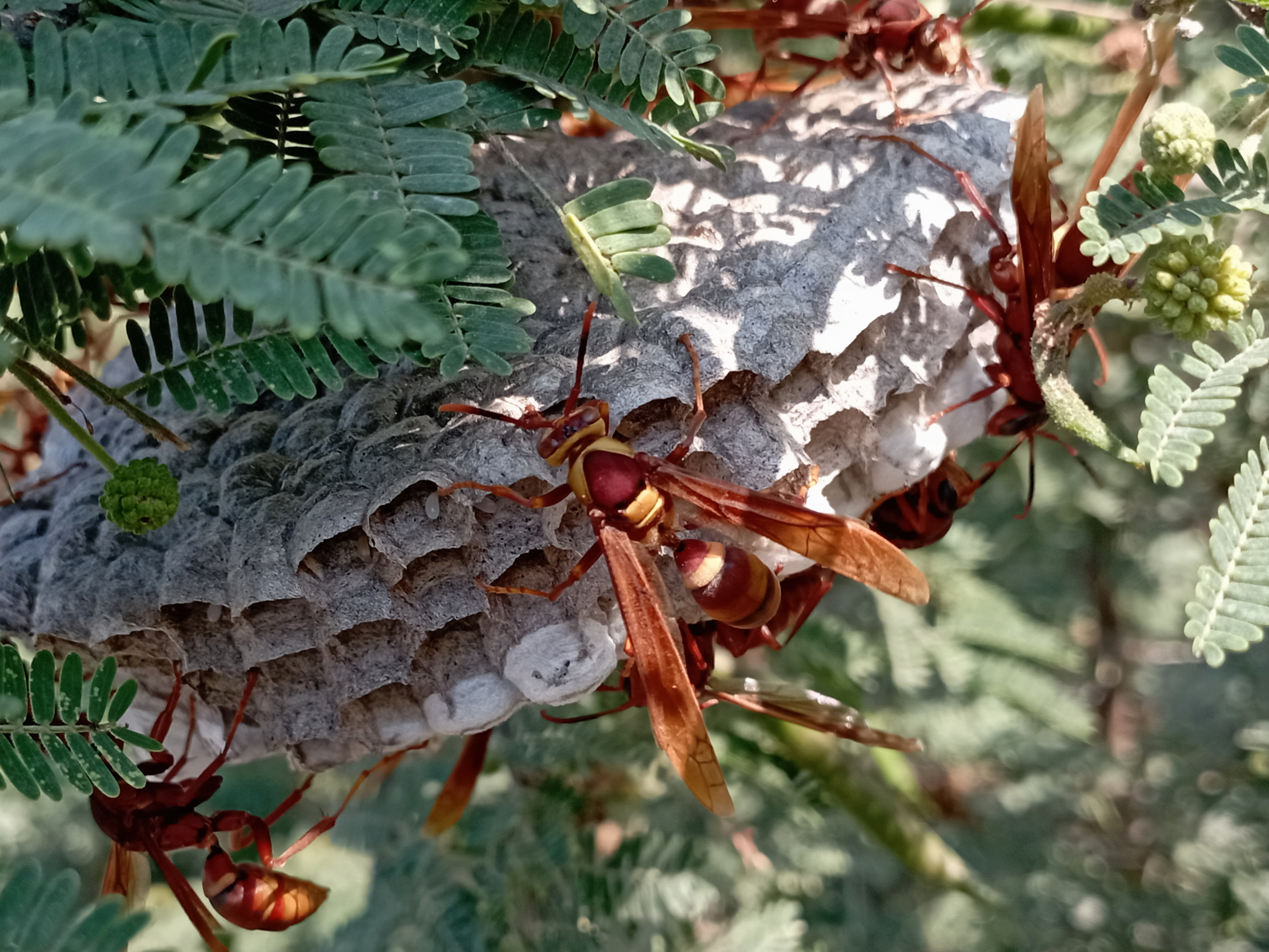
P. major making a nest

Queens are responsible for making the nests. Like most paper wasp nests, the nests of P. major major consist of a gray or papery brown material made by chewing wood fashioned into an open comb shape, containing multiple cells for the queen's brood. A central petiole anchors the nest. One can locate the nests under the roofs, rims, and window frames of houses. These nests may also be spotted under palm tree leaves, bridges, metal beams, branches, eaves or culverts. Generally nests are 19 cm in diameter.

Colonies consist of 4 to 19 females, 1 to 4 males, 35 to 46 larvae, 28 to 32 eggs, and 13 to 43 pupae within a nest at the time of male engagement in larval feeding.

== Distribution and habitat ==
P. major major's habitat is spread out among Central America. Many specimens have been obtained from various parts of Costa Rica, and are distributed all over Puerto Rico. It is most commonly found in the Dominican Republic, and can be found in other areas of Hispaniola. The wasp has also been seen in the United States, namely the states of Florida, Georgia, and Arizona. Recently, it has been spotted in Spain.

=== Potential invasion in Europe ===
Sightings of P. major major have been recorded in Spain. According to this study, P. major major may have been transferred over to Europe from the Americas via the shipping of imported goods. The paper wasp has been sighted enough times in Oviedo since 2008 for there to be an awareness of its establishment in the area. Though the most recent sightings have not been as frequent, due to the effects on the ecosystems invaded by, for example, Vespa velutina and Polistes dominula, there is a call to keep an eye on the population and to monitor its growth. P. major major is larger than most native European species, which can cause fear or panic in the local populace.

== Behavior ==
=== Communication ===
P. major major nestmates will engage in antennations, or tapping with the antennae, and head shakes during the distribution of food amongst themselves. A queen, worker, and drone of the named "Chavez" colony in an experiment had been observed participating in an event of prey distribution, which resulted in the drone taking the bulk of the prey and feeding it to the larvae. The worker and queen both shook their heads when offering food to other wasps. The queen antennated both the worker and drone on the head when her offerings were ignored.

=== Brood care ===
As with most paper wasp species, the female workers are the ones who care and help rear the queen's brood. This is also true for P. major major, but male members of the species have been found to aid in brood care occasionally as well. Drones have been observed feeding larvae within their cells on several occasions. It is believed that drones and workers receive nourishment through the liquids removed from the bolus, and they are in fact not acting altruistically when feeding the larvae the solid remains.

=== Nest care ===
When temperatures are high, workers fan the nest by rapidly vibrating their wings. Foragers have been observed alternating between finding prey and collecting water, regurgitating the water droplets around the nest. Fanning of the nest would continue, and the nest would cool off through evaporation. Drones are known to also fan the nest up to as long as a worker, after only a day or two from emergence.

== Interactions with other species ==
=== Diet ===
P. major major larvae primarily feed upon caterpillars and treehoppers. Adult wasps can not ingest solid foods, only liquids and those foods that have been ground up. The adults forage for prey and will return to the nest with the body of their catch. The female workers malaxate the prey, removing liquid from the bolus, and feed the solid remainder to the larvae in their cells. Drones have been found to participate in the same behavior as the workers, malaxating food boli and giving the remains to larvae.

=== Predators ===
P. major major and other Polistes major subspecies are preyed upon by various bird species, namely the red-bellied woodpecker (Melanerpes carolinus).

== Peptides ==
Three peptides, PMM1, PMM2, and PMM3 have been extracted and identified from the venom of Polistes major major. Being larger than native European species, medical treatments in Spain may not be strong enough to counter the stings of the bigger wasps, such as P. major major. Three peptides have been identified from P. major major venom.
