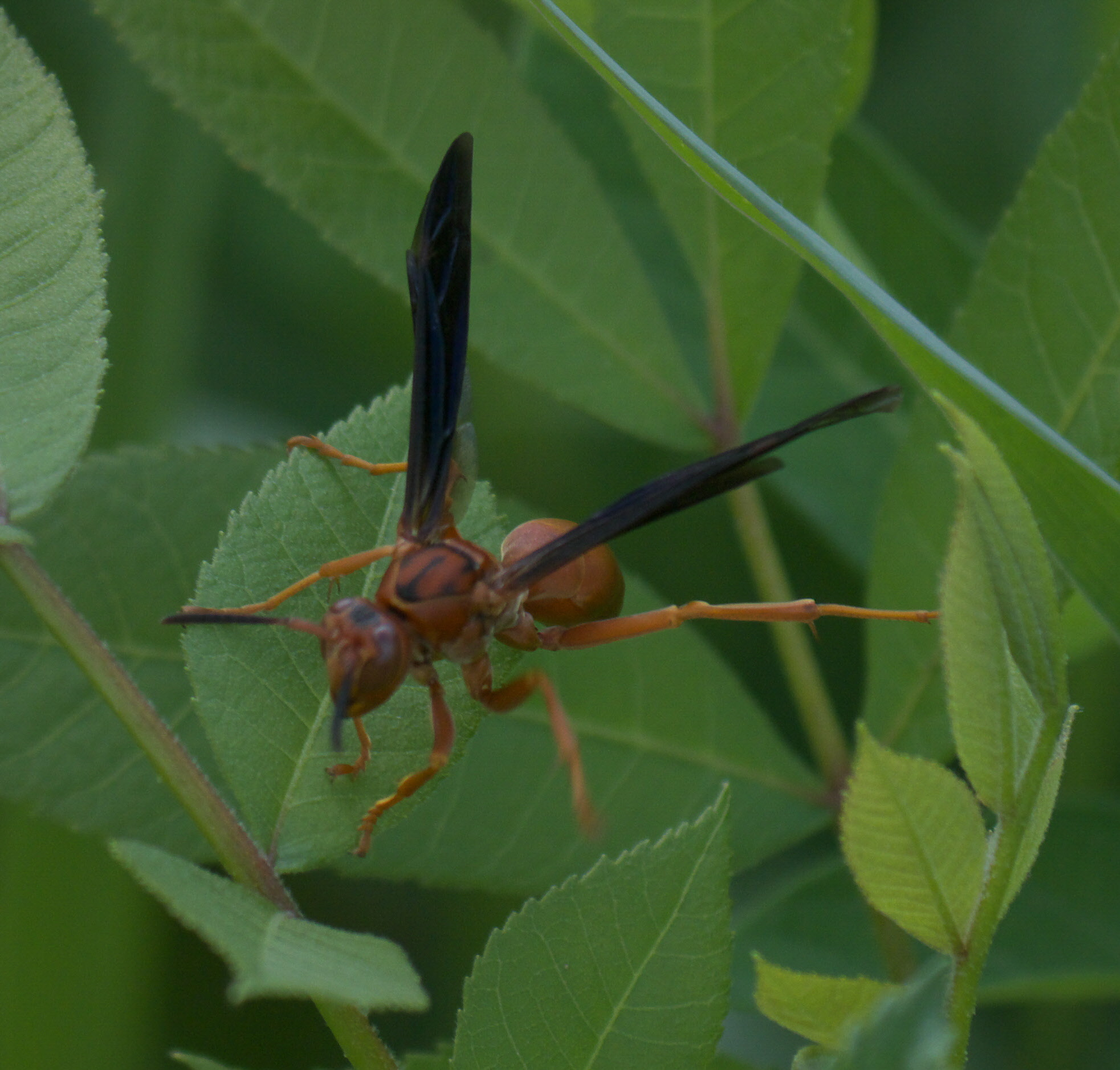

Scientific classification
- Kingdom: Animalia
- Phylum: Arthropoda
- Class: Insecta
- Order: Hymenoptera
- Family: Vespidae
- Genus: Polistes
- Species: P. rubiginosus

Binomial name
- Polistes rubiginosus Lepeletier, 1836

Synonyms
- Polistes perplexus Cresson, 1872; Polistes generosus Cresson, 1872; Polistes carolina (Linnaeus, 1767) in part

= Polistes rubiginosus =

Species of wasp

Polistes rubiginosus is one of two species of red paper wasp found in the eastern United States (the other being Polistes carolina) and is noted for the coarser ridges on its propodeum. It is a social wasp (subfamily Polistinae) in the family Vespidae. Until taxonomic revision by Matthias Buck in 2012, P. rubiginosus was long known under the name P. perplexus. It occurs northernmost from Maryland, Pennsylvania to northern Ohio, south to Georgia, and from there west to central Illinois, Kansas, Oklahoma, Texas, and Arizona.

== Taxonomy ==
It was known for a long time as P. perplexus, but in 2012 it was found that the older name P. rubiginosus actually referred to this species; before that the name P. rubiginosus was seen as a synonym of P. carolina.

P. perplexus was named in 1872 for six specimens collected in Texas by Ezra Townsend Cresson (said to have been published in 1870 in error in Karl Vorse Krombein (1979) and Matthias Buck et al. (2008)). Cresson himself does not mention P. carolina, but states that he found P. perplexus very closely resembling P. rubiginosus, also recognised as a species in his time, and perhaps just to be a male form of this taxon. He also described P. generosus as a new species in the same paper, from three specimens from Texas, stating that it "may be an extreme variety of perplexus". P. generosus was published on the next page after P. perplexus, which means that when the two taxa were considered synonym, P. perplexus had taxonomic priority because it was published first. Owain Richards saw it as a synonym of P. carolina in 1978, although Wade and Nelson recognised it as a species in a paper published the same year. Thus the taxon was for a long time, and until relatively recently, confused with P. carolina.

== Description ==
The length of the forewing is 18.0–21.5 mm in the female, 17.0–18.0 mm in the male. The body of the creature is almost entirely rusty red, broken by a number of black to dark brown markings. These markings consist of a usually well developed spot around the eyes, this rarely divided into individual spots around each eye, and often a spot in front of pronotal carina. In some cases there are yellow markings on the propodeal valves and tarsi.

Polistes rubiginosus and P. carolina are the only large red-coloured wasp species in the eastern US. P. rubiginosus is, however, extremely similar to P. carolina, and can be found in the same regions; the key morphological difference being the malar area (the "cheek") seen from the side, but this works only for the female wasps. This area and the gena are covered in silvery pubescent hairs. P. rubiginosus is the only Polistes wasp in the P. fuscatus-group to have this characteristic, all other species have this area bare or almost so. Both sexes of P. rubiginosus can also be distinguished from P. carolina by the coarser transverse ridging of the propodeum.

== Distribution ==
This species is endemic to the eastern United States. It has been recorded from Pennsylvania south to Georgia and west to Kansas, Oklahoma, and Texas. This currently understood distribution largely overlaps with that of P. carolina, apart from absence in Florida.

Because this species is very similar to P. carolina, its historical range may have been under-reported.

== Ecology ==
The ecology is poorly known because of the aforementioned confusion with P. carolina. It is a eusocial insect, building nests in sheltered locations such as in hollow trees, or under wooden platforms and inside storage buildings.

== Conservation ==
The IUCN has not evaluated this species' conservation status.

It has been recorded as present in the following protected areas:

- Archbold Biological Station, Florida, US.
- Oxley Nature Center, Tulsa, Oklahoma, US.
