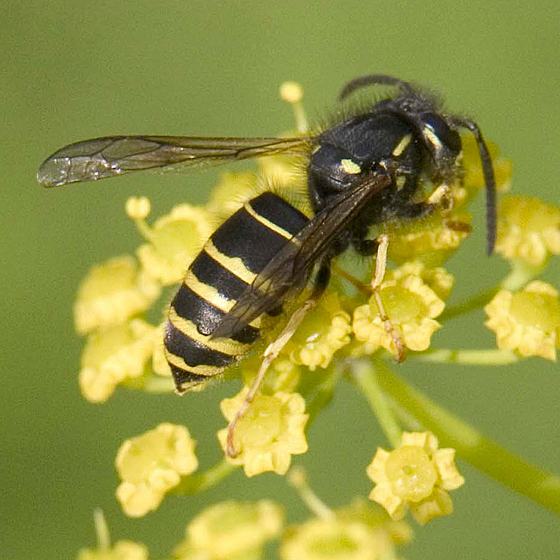

Scientific classification
- Kingdom: Animalia
- Phylum: Arthropoda
- Clade: Pancrustacea
- Class: Insecta
- Order: Hymenoptera
- Family: Vespidae
- Genus: Vespula
- Species: V. acadica

Binomial name
- Vespula acadica (Sladen, 1918)

Synonyms
- Vespa americana Buysson, 1905; Vespula sladeni Bequard, 1932

= Vespula acadica =

Forest yellowjacket

Species of wasp

Vespula acadica, also known as the forest yellowjacket, is a North American species of eusocial wasp which is part of the "rufa" group within the genus Vespula. It is a black and yellow wasp that is found in arboreal areas and builds its nests most often in decaying vegetation like logs, but has occasionally been found to build aerial nests. Due to its preference for forests V. acadica does not normally come into contact with humans; however, when colonies are disturbed, workers of this yellowjacket may be quite aggressive and persistent and sting repeatedly.

== Taxonomy and phylogenetics ==
V. acadica belongs to the genus of Vespula which includes numerous species of social wasps. The wasps within the genus Vespula are found throughout the Northern Hemisphere and are commonly referred to as yellowjackets in North America. Vespula wasps are commonly mistaken for other genera, most often the paper wasps of the genus Polistes. V. acadica is considered to be a member of the Vespula rufa group and is most closely related to other members of the group, including Vespula consobrina and Vespula atropilosa.

== Description and identification ==
V. acadica is black with yellow markings and ranges from 10-15mm in length (AKA 1-1.5cm). The underside of its scape is yellow, rather than completely black. It is very similar in appearance to V. atropilosa but the apex of the middle black region of the second gastral segment is rounded; whereas it is pointed in V. atropilosa.

== Distribution and habitat ==
V. acadica is distributed throughout Boreal North America. Its range stretches from Alaska down the West Coast to southern California, and into the southwest United States. In the east it has a more northerly distribution through the Great Lakes, and also to the east coast as far south as the Carolinas.

== Colony cycle ==
The V. acadica colony consists of morphologically distinct queens and workers. They form annual nests which are governed by a single queen. Colony behavior in V. acadica closely resembles that of other members of the V. rufa group. Most colonies of V. acadica that have been observed are relatively small, containing 75-400 workers and 3-4 combs, and contain a nest with only one worker-rearing comb. Colonies are characterized by short duration, foraging of live prey only, and a flexible, loosely woven nest envelope. The seasonal cycle of V. acadica usually begins in mid-July, with the onset of reproductive rearing, and is completed in most areas by the last week of August or first week of September.

V. acadica normally builds its nests in decaying vegetation such as logs or leaf piles but, although uncommon, aerial nests have been reported. The entrance tunnels are normally 15 to 25 cm, but can be as long as 40 cm. The deepest subterranean nest found was 15 cm under the surface. A nest is composed of one worker-producing comb and one to three reproductive-producing combs. The largest mature colony found had an adult population of 425 workers, 70 males, and 78 queens and had four combs with a total of 1,791 cells. Many nests play host to the parasitoid Ichneumonid Sphecophaga cocoons, probably S. vesparum burra and a few nests were found to host eggs of Fannia spp. on the exterior.

== Behavior ==
=== Worker specialization ===
Overall, a degree of plasticity is found within V. consorbina’s behaviors, which may be applicable to V. acadica as well. This allows for the individuals to shift between different activities depending on what is needed at a specific time by the colony. However, while these wasps are flexible with regard to roles, there is a noted tendency for workers to specialize in one specific task. These tendencies are referred to as flexible age polyethism and task fixation, and are common in many Vespinae and Polistinae wasps. The most dominant task witnessed in workers was inactivity, followed by trophallaxis, nursing, thermoregulation then defense and foraging, in that order.

=== Nest sanitation ===
Workers of V. acadica are not known to thoroughly remove feces from below the comb. This behavior is seen in many members of the Vespula rufa group. Workers occasionally will remove both liquid and solid feces, but in many cases the workers will consume the liquid feces but leave behind the solids. Occasionally, workers will feed the liquid to the larvae after drinking up the wastes. Sanitation behaviors are seen at a decreased rate during periods of colony decline.

=== Mauling ===
Mauling is an agonistic interaction that is often seen among workers in yellow jacket colonies. The mauler bites the dorsum of the thorax and gaster of the maulee. Ninety-seven percent of maulings last for 10 seconds or less, but some observed maulings were as long as 4 minutes. These interactions are mostly seen amongst older workers and occur throughout colony decline and up until total colony termination. These interactions between workers usually involve only one mauler at a time, but that same mauler often attacks multiple other workers that are nearby. These behaviors and their implications are still not fully understood by scientists.

=== Mating behavior ===
V. acadica males readily attempt to mate with the queens. Males approach the queens from the side and attempt to mount the dorsum of the queen's gaster. The queen often attempts to turn and face the male in order to bite him. The male continues to follow the queen, and mounts her while grasping her thorax with all six of his legs. He then curls his gaster under the abdomen of the queen in order to insert his genitalia. If the queen is unreceptive, she will curl her gaster toward her head to form a C-shape to prevent penetration and use her legs to dislodge the male.

== Kin selection ==
=== Genetic relatedness within colonies ===
According to kin selection theory, relatedness is extremely important in reproductive behavior. This is because by favoring offspring that are close relatives, this individual can increase the likelihood of its genes being passed into the next generation. Like most Vespula wasps, V. acadica has high effective paternity(>2). This derived trait is the measure of queen mating frequency, and it also takes into account the use of sperm. Evidence indicates that the opportunity for multiple matings is present for V. acadica, even though the queens do not participate in these matings.

=== Worker policing ===
Although V. acadica workers are unable to mate, they are able to lay haploid eggs, which are destined to become males. This issue of male production often leads to conflict between workers and the queen. Because the effective paternity is >2, workers are more related to brothers (the queen’s sons) than to nephews (other workers’ sons) so the production of offspring by males are creating sons less related to the other workers than those produced by the queen. This leads to worker policing, an act carried out by workers to ensure there is little male production by workers. Various experiments of Vespula wasps have shown that absence of worker reproduction can most likely be attributed to worker policing. However, V. acadica is one of the few exceptions to the Vespula level generalization regarding worker policing. Worker ovary activation, worker laying, and overt queen-worker aggressions have been cited in members of the species as well as in other species within the Vespula rufa group. While these findings may indicate variation within Vespula species regarding conflict resolution and paternity, more research must be carried out in order to fully understand these implications.

=== Queen aggression ===
V. acadica queens are rarely aggressive towards workers. However in certain situations, queens have been consistently observed to behave in a more aggressive manner than usual. Often during oviposition or related activities, queens put on displays to make the workers avoid or back down from the queen. These most commonly occurred when a worker was trimming a cap remnant or antennating an emerging individual which is a behavior usually carried out by the queen. In most cases, workers will begin the process of cell inspection but then back down and allow the queen to finish trimming a cap and then to oviposit.

=== Sex allocation ===
The increased paternity seen in V. acadica leads to a lower relatedness between worker and their sisters, but not between workers and their brothers. These discrepancies are important in determining the allocation of resources made by workers to each sex. Estimates of sex ratios indicate that near equal numbers of males and females are produced. However, the queens are much larger in size than males which suggests sex allocation is biased towards females in a significant ratio.

== Interaction with other species ==
=== Diet ===
V. acadica, like other members of the V. rufa group, rely on live arthropod prey as their main source of protein and collect natural carbohydrate sources. V. acadica workers are known to prey on live caterpillars, flies, and hemipterans. V. acadica wasps do not scavenge or forage on freshly killed insects. The diet of V. rufa group species contain less variety than those of the larger colony wasps like those in the V. vulgaris group. It has been suggested that V. acadica are not considered pests by humans because they exclusively hunt for live prey and do not scavenge from areas like garbage cans and picnic areas where they would most likely encounter humans.

=== Parasites ===
Social parasitism is a strategy in which one social species depends on a different social species to rear its offspring. This is a common occurrence in eusocial insects, including the genus Vespula. Vespula infernalis is a known obligate, permanent social parasite of V. acadica. V. infernalis use the host nest of V. acadica to raise its worker caste, resulting in a mixed colony of parasite and host workers. Eventually, the parasite queen will become the sole reproductive head, and her workers will outnumber the host workers, until the colony is exclusively made up of the parasitic species. During the queen nest stage, V. acadica queens are able to defend her nests from these parasites. Discoveries of dead queens in the entrance tunnels of colonies indicate that resident queens are very aggressive towards potential usurpers and are likely to kill in order to defend their colony. However, after worker emergence the queen was less vigorous in her defense of the nest, and parasites were more likely to successfully usurp the colony. Colonies are most likely to be usurped when there are 20–40 workers because the worker force is large enough to allow for a maximum output of parasite reproduction but not so large as to provide a strong defense against usurpation.

=== Defense ===
There are two significant aspects of defense witnessed in V. acadica that are different from nest defense practices in other Vespula wasps. Firstly, workers hover in a manner similar to workers of Vespula consobrina while defining the colony during excavations. Also, workers are known to take on an immobile stance on the envelope or the edges of the comb during substrate vibrations of the nest.
