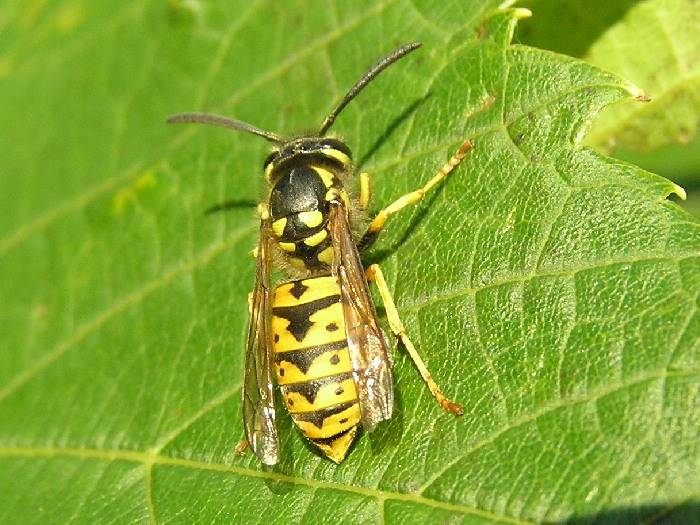
- German wasp

Scientific classification
- Domain: Eukaryota
- Kingdom: Animalia
- Phylum: Arthropoda
- Class: Insecta
- Order: Hymenoptera
- Family: Vespidae
- Genus: Vespula
- Subgenus: Paravespula; Blüthgen, 1938

= Paravespula =

Subgenus of wasps

Paravespula is a small subgenus of yellowjacket wasps, including some of the best-known wasp species in the world: the German wasp, Vespula germanica; the eastern yellowjacket Vespula maculifrons; the western yellowjacket Vespula pensylvanica; and the common wasp, Vespula vulgaris. It is occasionally treated as a separate genus, but this is not widely accepted.

These particular wasps have a tendency to make underground nests with the opening usually showing from a crack in a wall or an opening in a small grass hill, which makes it quite difficult to locate to get the colony removed. The wasps are aggressive and usually attack if their nests are threatened. Species in the subgenus Paravespula differ from those in the subgenus Vespula (s.str) in having larger colonies with up to thousands of individuals and several medium to large brood combs.
