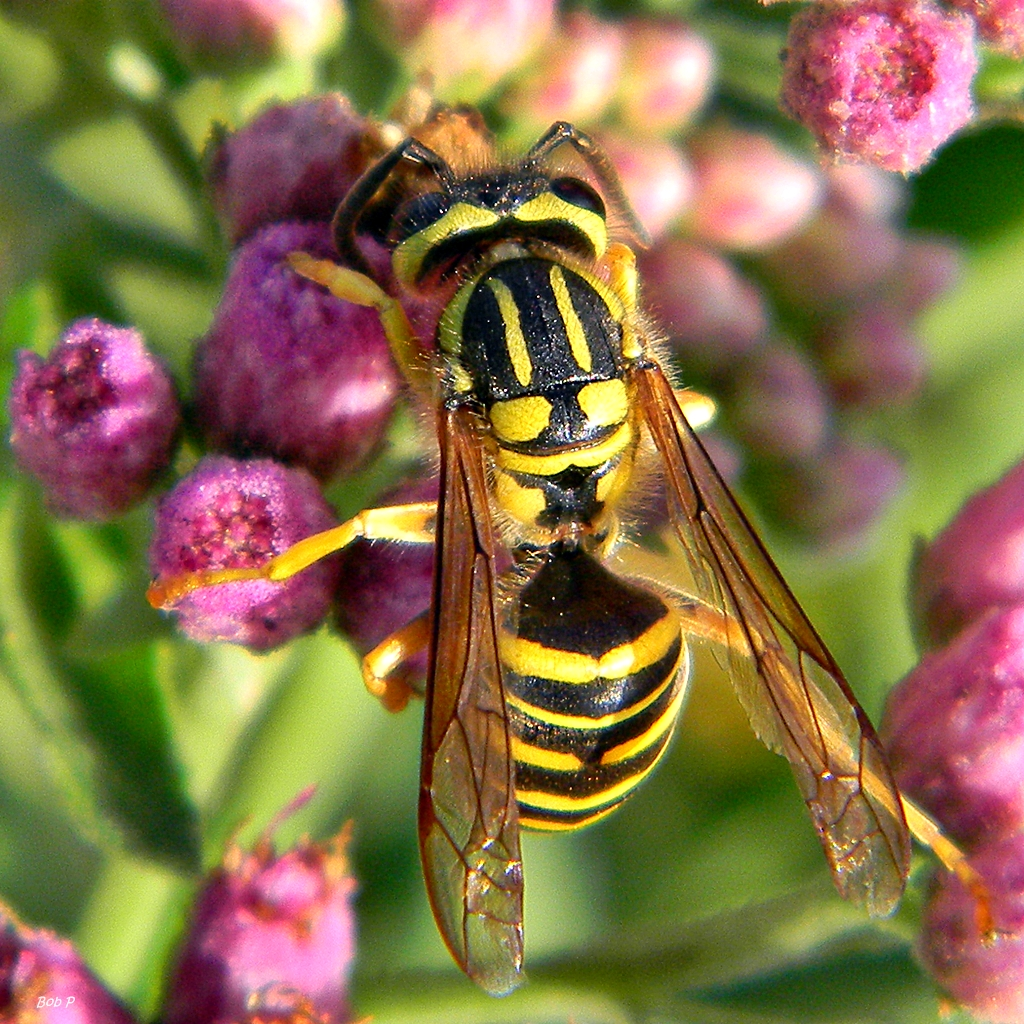

Scientific classification
- Kingdom: Animalia
- Phylum: Arthropoda
- Clade: Pancrustacea
- Class: Insecta
- Order: Hymenoptera
- Family: Vespidae
- Genus: Vespula
- Species: V. squamosa

Binomial name
- Vespula squamosa (Drury, 1773)

= Vespula squamosa =

Southern yellowjacket

Species of wasp

Vespula squamosa, or the southern yellowjacket, is a social wasp. This species can be identified by its distinctive black and yellow patterning and orange queen. This species is typically found in eastern North America, and its territory extends as far south as Central America. Within these territories, they create enormous, multiple-comb nests. The colonies may be either annual or perennial depending on the climate, and in many perennial nests, polygyny takes place. In addition, this species uses pheromones both as a sexual attractant and an alarm signal. This species feeds on insects and animal carcasses; it does not produce honey. V. squamosa, a social insect, has developed a parasitic relationship with the species V. vidua and V. maculifrons. Due to their painful, venomous stings, the species is considered a pest.

== Taxonomy and phylogeny ==
V. squamosa is commonly called the southern yellowjacket. It was described by Dru Drury around 1770. It is a member of the family Vespidae, which includes paper wasps (subfamily Polistinae), pollen wasps (subfamily Masarinae), potter and mason wasps (subfamily Eumeninae), and yellow jackets (subfamily Vespinae). The family Vespidae has about 4000 species, the majority of which are not social. Within the subfamily Vespinae, however, the roughly 80 species are all eusocial, including V. squamosa. They create either annual or perennial nests, and some species, including V. squamosa, are parasites to other Vespinae species. Within the subfamily Vespinae, the four genera are Provespa, Vespa, Dolichovespula, and Vespula. Within the genus Vespula are 18 species. The southern yellowjacket is fairly closely related to V. maculifrons (eastern yellowjacket), and V. squamosa is a social parasite of V. maculifrons. V. squamosa is also closely related to V. rufa.

== Description and identification ==
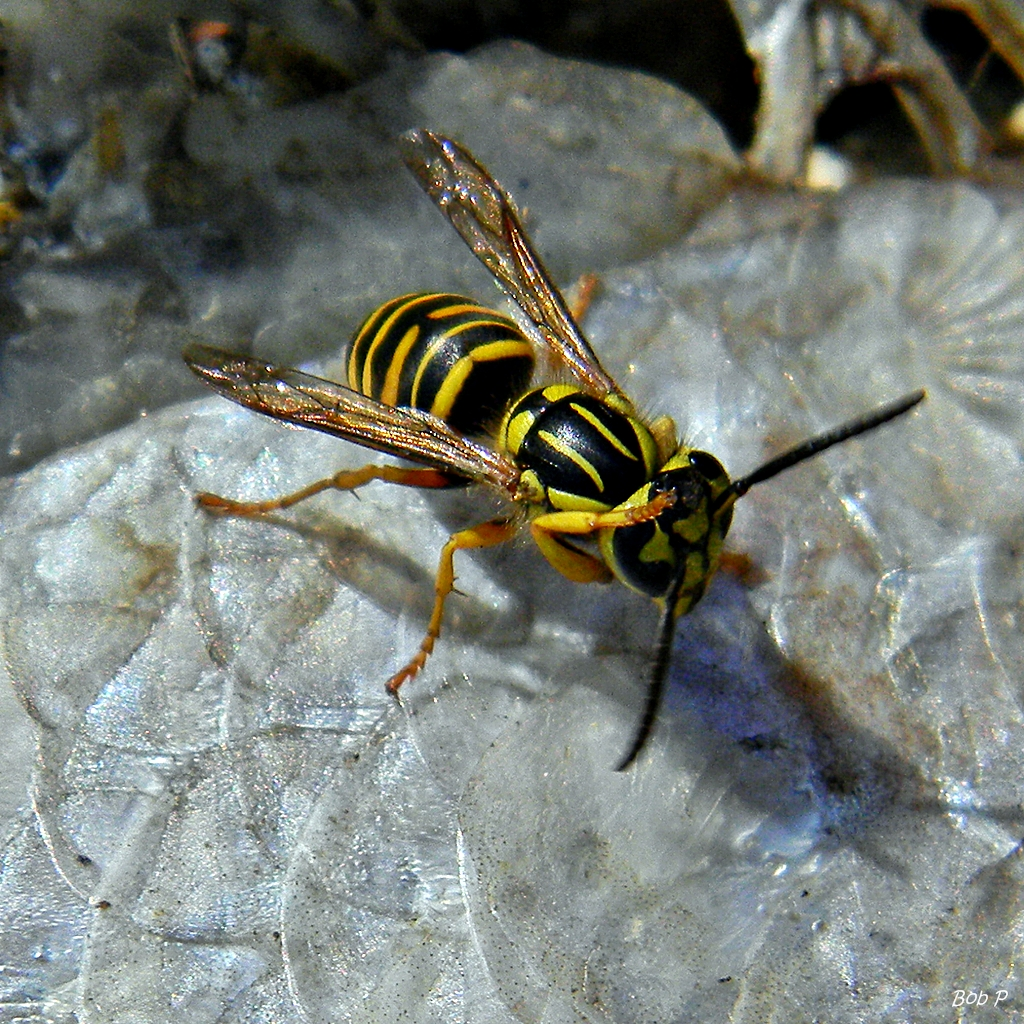
Stripes on the back of V. squamosa distinguish it from other species of yellow jackets.

V. squamosa is typically about 0.5 inches (1.3 cm) long and distinguishable by its black body and yellow striping pattern over its entire body. This species has clear wings and a hairless body. While the males and workers resemble other yellowjackets, the queen has a unique appearance. She is significantly larger than the males and workers and is more orange in color. In addition, both V. squamosa and the V. sulphurea have two stripes on their scuta, which differentiates them from other species.

== Distribution and habitat ==
Southern yellowjackets are typically found in the eastern United States and as far south as Mexico and Guatemala. Their territory expands as far west as Texas and as far east as the Atlantic Ocean. These areas tend to have fairly warm weather, and in some cases, tropical climates. Within these territories, nests are typically found in unnatural habitats, such as yards, parks, and sides of roads. Some colonies, though, are found in pine forests. Their parasitic relationship with V. maculifrons can result in V. squamosa colony formation in hardwood forests, a habitat more typical of V. maculifrons. Most nests are subterranean, though some have been found above ground or in walls, close to V. maculifrons nests.

=== Nests ===
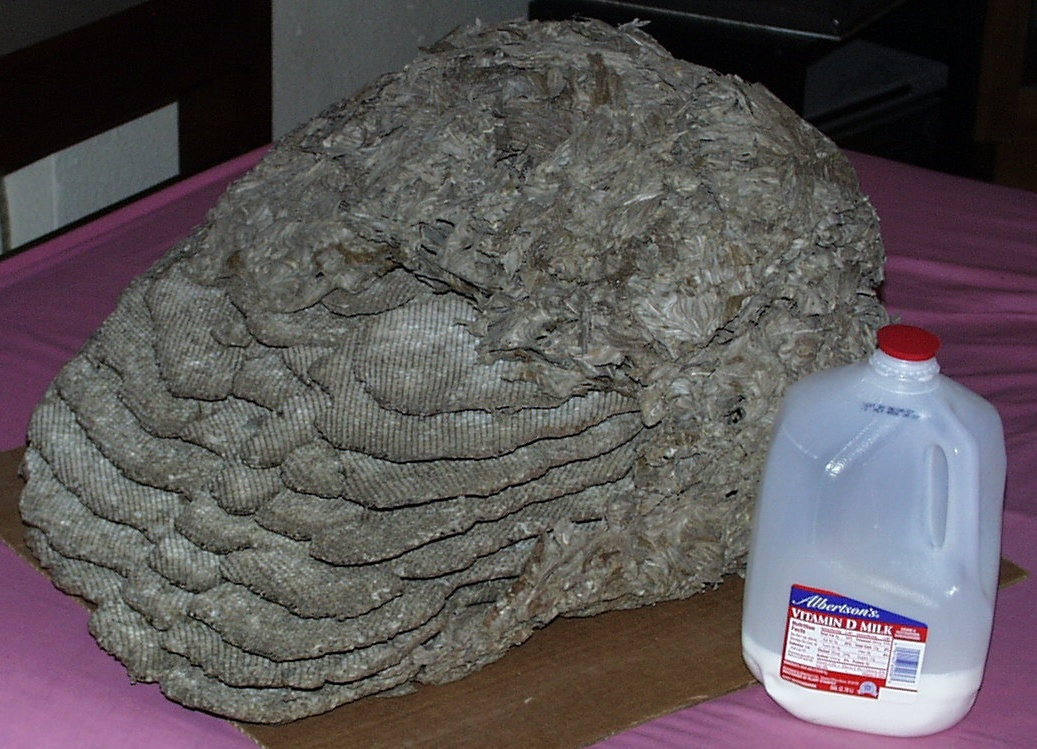
A two-year V. squamosa nest

Southern yellowjackets' nests are typically built either in unnatural or disturbed environments such as yards, picnic tables, and other artificial environments and can be aerial or underground. They are usually made from chewed vegetable fibers. Colonies have been reported to contain from 9000 to more than 450,000 cells. One of the largest reported nests occupied a pine tree and the dirt underneath it. The nest was around 114.3 centimetres (45.0 in) in diameter at its widest point and had over 50 combs in the trunk section alone. While most social wasps have annual nests, many instances of multiple-season V. squamosa nests have been found, especially in the southern coastal areas of the species' range.

== Colony cycle ==
=== Annual colonies ===
The colony cycle for southern yellowjackets is fairly variable. Many annual colonies begin in late May or early June when the queen infringes on a small V. maculifrons colony (about 85% of colonies begin in this parasitic takeover, while only 15% of colonies are independent). Whereas workers do not survive the winter in annual colonies, the queen does survive, and in the spring, when she is ready to lay more eggs, she scouts for small V. maculifrons and V. vidua colonies to serve as the host colony. These “takeovers” can often be violent as evidenced by many dead queens found in the nests. This violence tends to be conspecific, meaning that multiple V. squamosa queens are fighting for control of the host nest or for control of the polygynous nest. A successful usurpation constitutes the beginning of the parasitic relationship between a V. squamosa colony and a V. maculifrons colony. These colonies are built around the host nest, thus increase the size of the initial host nest. The queen begins the building process by constructing queen cells and laying eggs that will hatch larvae. The larvae enter the pupal phase after about a month. Once more of these female workers have been produced (late July or early August), the colony size begins to grow significantly as worker cell construction begins. This period from July to August is the major growth period during which up to 4000 workers could be producing cells. Workers build smaller 4.0- to 5.0-mm-wide cells, while the queens build “queen cells” which are about 7.0 mm wide. Most nests have their maximum number of queen and worker combs between October and December, the end of the seasonal colony cycle. As the season ends, the queen hibernates so she can, in many cases, begin a new colony the next year.

=== Overwintering colonies ===
While most colonies are annual, perennial colonies exist, especially in Florida. These nests tend to be found in the southernmost regions of their habitat where it is possible for the nest to survive through the winter. Because these nests are built for and inhabited for several years, they tend to be much larger than annual nests. In fact, these nests are about 50-60 liters in volume and can contain at least 60,000 cells. The decreased production of the winter brood further distinguishes overwintering nests from annual nests. In addition, continuous production of reproductives occurs even through the winter. These nests also have from six to over 100 reproductive queens.

== Mating behavior ==
=== Mating system ===
Southern yellowjackets have a polygynous mating system: a colony has more than one queen. In other Vespula species, polygyny tends to be found in mild climates where the colony can last more than a year. Given that many of this species live in temperate or subtropical environments, perennial nests have been observed. Polygynous perennial colonies occur when reproductive females (queens) reproduce in the colony instead of leaving it. As a result of the multiple queens and additional seasons and workers in perennial nests, these colonies tend to be much larger than their annual counterparts. While scientists have argued that a polygynous mating system would breed disease and reduce fitness, many examples of the polygynous nests are seen. The parasitic nature of the species goes hand in hand with their polygynous mating system. In a parasitic system, females lay eggs in a different species' nests, and in a polygynous system a female of the same species lays eggs in the nest in the hopes of overtaking the current queen. Dead queens of the same species have been found in V. squamosa nests, supporting the idea of competition between queens as a result of polygyny. This polygyny may be tolerated in large multiple-season nests because the size of the nest reduces interactions between the competing queens. This process of seizing the nest within the species could provide the basis for parasitic nature of this species, as the takeover of a nest either within species or between species is a fairly similar process.

=== Mating of the queen ===
Just as workers are able to communicate via pheromones to co-ordinate attacks, the queen also produces her own pheromones. Whereas the workers have a pheromone to spread alarm, she has a pheromone to attract male mates.

== Sexual dimorphism ==
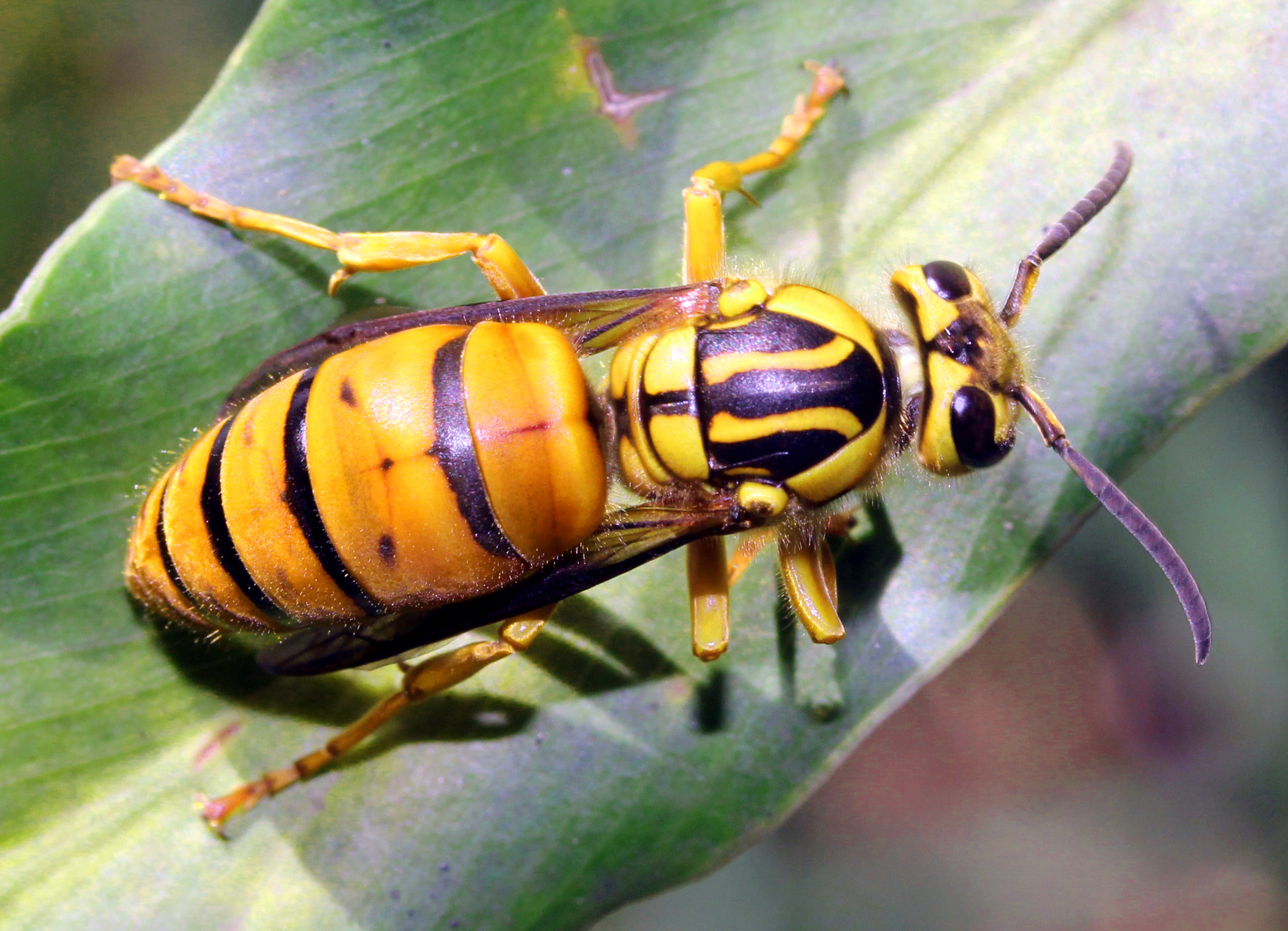
A southern yellow-jacket queen

Sexual and caste dimorphism is very pronounced in this species. While all individuals have a distinctive marking on their scuta, workers, males, and queens all have different appearances. Workers and males have similar black and yellow striped patterning, but the queen has fewer black markings and a more orange/brown coloring. Wing length also helps to differentiate between the worker and male. Workers have fore wing lengths of 9.5-11.0 mm, and males' are about 12.5 mm. In addition, the queen is about 4 mm longer than her worker and male counterparts.

== Defense and alarm signals ==
As a form of defense of their nests, southern yellowjacket workers use alarm pheromones to communicate with each other to coordinate an attack. These behaviors are chemically mediated, and these alarm pheromones cause many social wasp species to leave the nest and attack whatever may be threatening it. Individuals can emit this pheromone from a few places in their bodies. Pheromone activity occurs in the stomach, and more specifically in a venom gland within the stomach. Odors on objects or people attacked by V. squamosa differ from the previously isolated chemical alarm pheromone, N-3-methylbutylacetamide. A second source of an alarm pheromone is found in the venom glands of the head of an individual. The alarm pheromones may be applied by the mandible.

== Diet ==
This species is predatory and typically eats live insects, but they also feed on the flesh of deceased prey. They typically prey on arthropods, including spiders and caterpillars. For larvae to grow into the pupal state, adult workers find prey and bring food back for them. When establishing the colony, the queen goes out in search of nectar and insects for the larvae, as well. This species does not produce honey, though.

== Interactions with other organisms ==
=== Parasitic relationships ===
Most southern yellowjackets are parasitic, in that they benefit at the expense of another species, as seen in their nest formation, as they build their nests around those of another species. Only about 15% of the nests are independently founded. Evidence shows V. squamosa as a social parasite of V. vidua (ground hornet) and V. maculifrons (eastern yellowjacket). As this species depends on other species for part of its nest, the location of its nests is often contingent on the location of the host's nests.

=== Human interactions ===
This species is currently abundant in urban areas, as their colonies tend to be found in unnatural environments (roadsides, wall voids, parks, etc.). Because of this close proximity to humans and the size of the nests, this species is typically considered a pest. The close interactions between southern yellowjackets and humans commonly lead to multiple, painful stings. Their stings are venomous, which causes the pain, and workers can sting several times. These stinging attacks are typically effects of alarm and occur in defense of their colony, so disturbing a nest can result in multiple stings.
