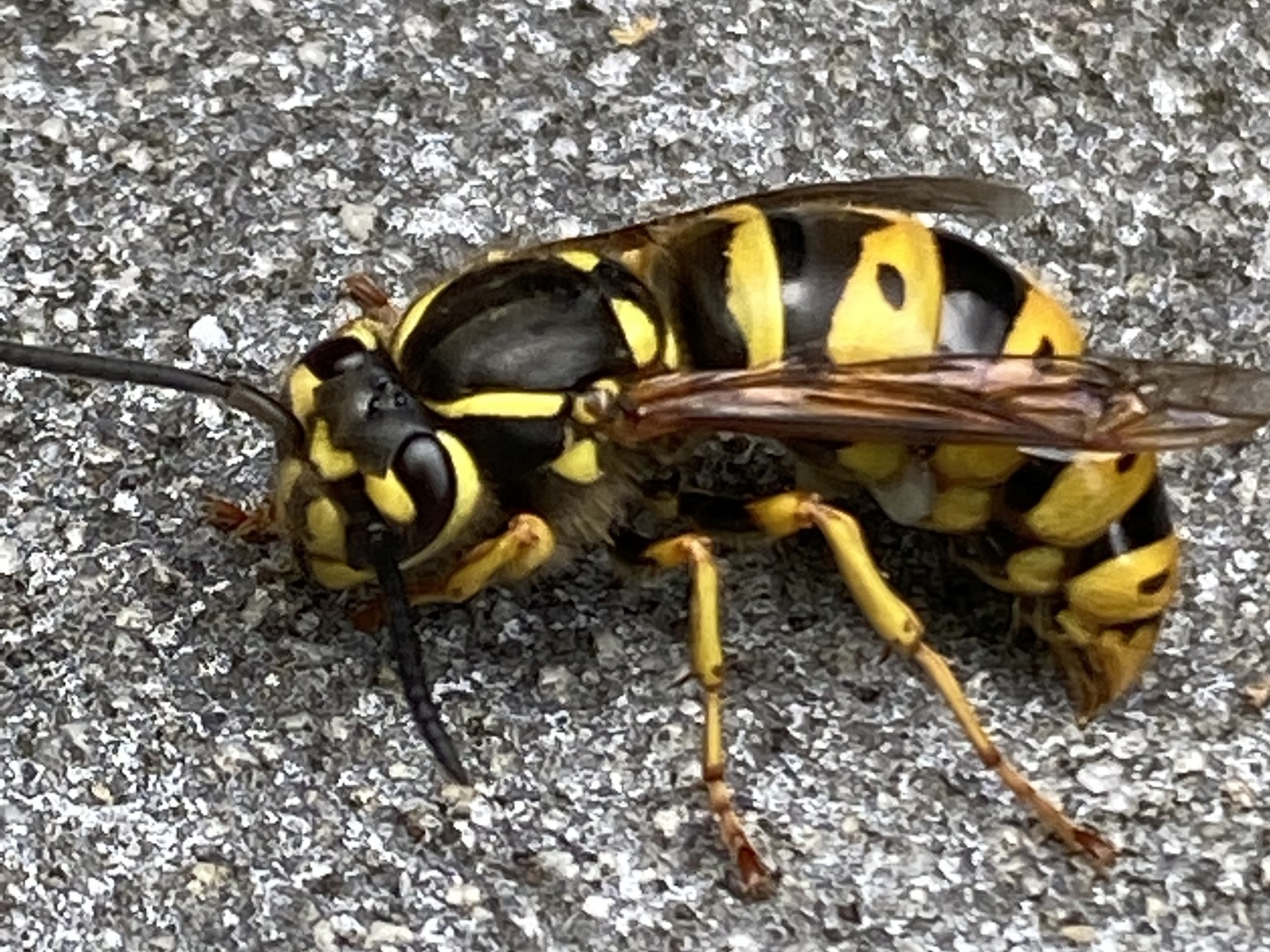

Scientific classification
- Kingdom: Animalia
- Phylum: Arthropoda
- Clade: Pancrustacea
- Class: Insecta
- Order: Hymenoptera
- Family: Vespidae
- Genus: Vespula
- Species: V. flavopilosa

Binomial name
- Vespula flavopilosa Jakobson, 1978

= Vespula flavopilosa =

Species of yellowjacket

Vespula flavopilosa, also known as the downy yellowjacket, is a species of yellowjacket found in North America.
