= Vespula ingrica =

Scientific classification
- Kingdom: Animalia
- Phylum: Arthropoda
- Clade: Pancrustacea
- Class: Insecta
- Order: Hymenoptera
- Family: Vespidae
- Genus: Vespula
- Species: V. ingrica

Binomial name
- Vespula ingrica Birula, 1931

Species of wasp

Vespula ingrica, the grey yellowjacket, is a species of wasp in the family Vespidae. It was described by Alekseï Andreïevitch Bialynitski-Biroulia (Birula) in 1931. The species current range is unknown, same with other aspects and characteristics of the species too.
