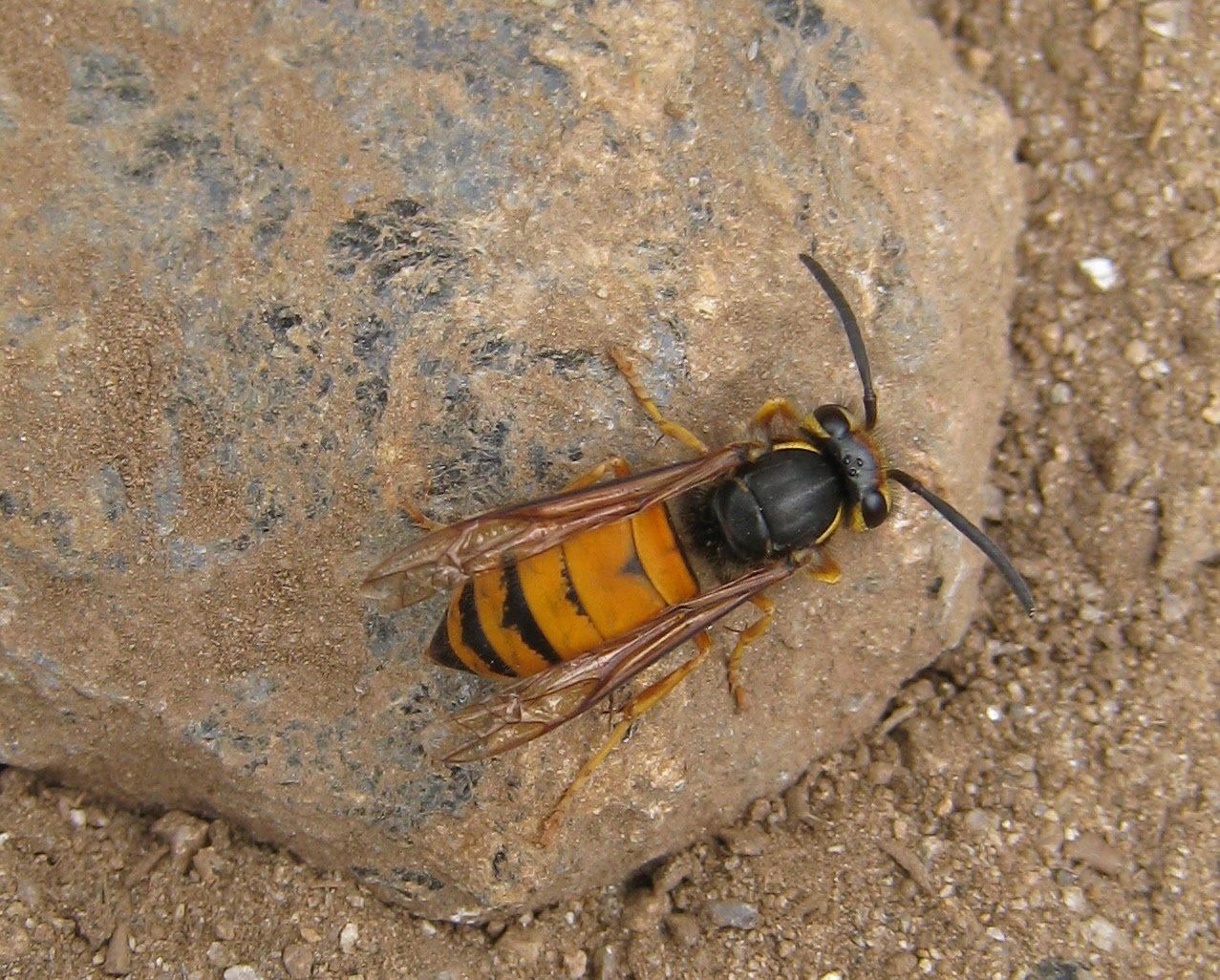
- Vespula structor, Nepal

Scientific classification
- Kingdom: Animalia
- Phylum: Arthropoda
- Clade: Pancrustacea
- Class: Insecta
- Order: Hymenoptera
- Family: Vespidae
- Genus: Vespula
- Species: V. structor

Binomial name
- Vespula structor (Smith, 1870)

Synonyms
- Vespa structor (Smith, 1870); Vespa structrix (Schulz, 1906); Vespula gongshanensis (Dong, 2005)

= Vespula structor =

Species of wasp

Vespula structor is a species of wasp in the family Vespidae found in India, Nepal, Laos, Myanmar, China and Bhutan.
