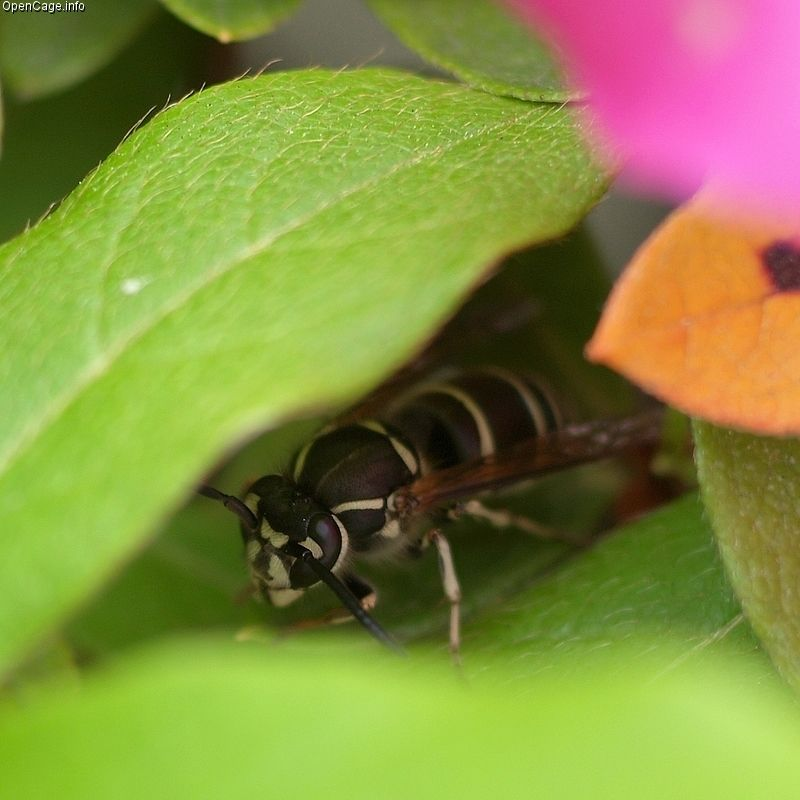

Scientific classification
- Kingdom: Animalia
- Phylum: Arthropoda
- Clade: Pancrustacea
- Class: Insecta
- Order: Hymenoptera
- Family: Vespidae
- Genus: Vespula
- Species: V. flaviceps

Binomial name
- Vespula flaviceps (Smith, 1870)

= Vespula flaviceps =

Species of insect

Vespula flaviceps is a species of social wasp in the genus Vespula. It found in Eastern Asia and Japan. Studies have suggested that the queens of this species may mate with more males and use sperm more evenly. The reason for this is not yet well understood.

== Taxonomy ==
=== Synonyms ===
V. flaviceps has been described by various other binomial names. A list of such names is presented below:

- Vespa flavior Stolfa, 1934
- Vespa japonica de Saussure, 1858
- Vespa karenkona Sonan, 1929
- Vespa lewisii (Cameron, 1903)
- Vespa quadrimaculata Sonan, 1929
- Vespa saussurei Schulz, 1906
- Vespula gracilia Lee, 1986
- Vespula pionganensis Giordani Soika, 1976
- Vespula yulongensis Dong and Wang

=== Subspecies ===
V. flaviceps has two subspecies. They are V. f. flaviceps and V. f. lewisii.

== Distribution and habitat ==
V. flaviceps is native to Eastern Asia and Japan. It can be found most prominently on the Japanese Islands, but is also present in South Korea and the southern portion of Primorsky Krai. Its population may be threatened by invasive raccoons, which prey upon it during the summer and autumn.

V. flaviceps is found in forests. During a two-year study in Japan, the species was observed to be one of the predominant species in the natural deciduous forests of northern Kanto. In 2001, it was officially recorded as one of the predominant species in this area, making up, along with two other species, 91% of all social wasps caught in a forest sampled. However, the same species was found to be much less abundant than Vespa species when attracted using a different bait.

== As food ==
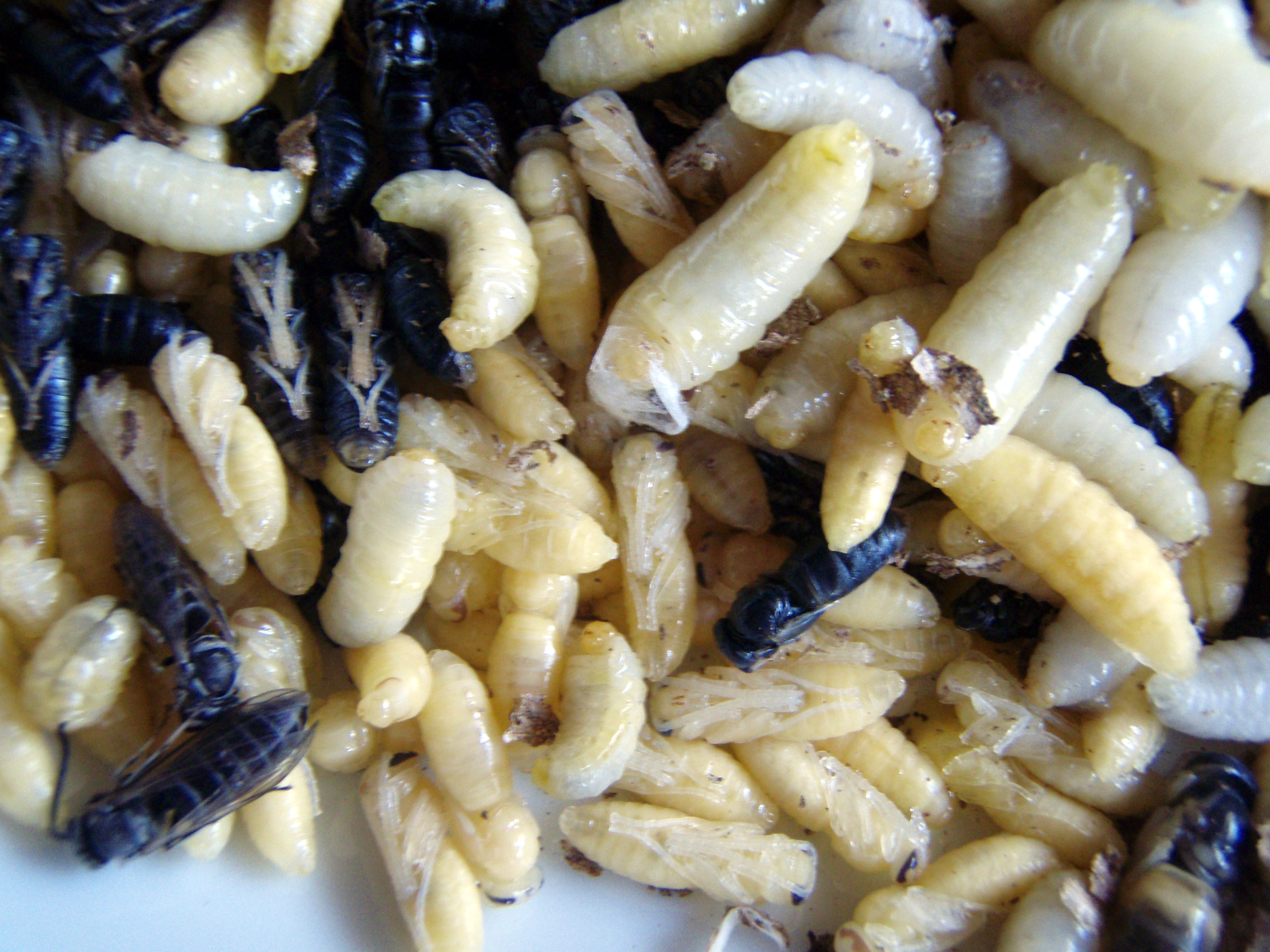
V. flaviceps larvae

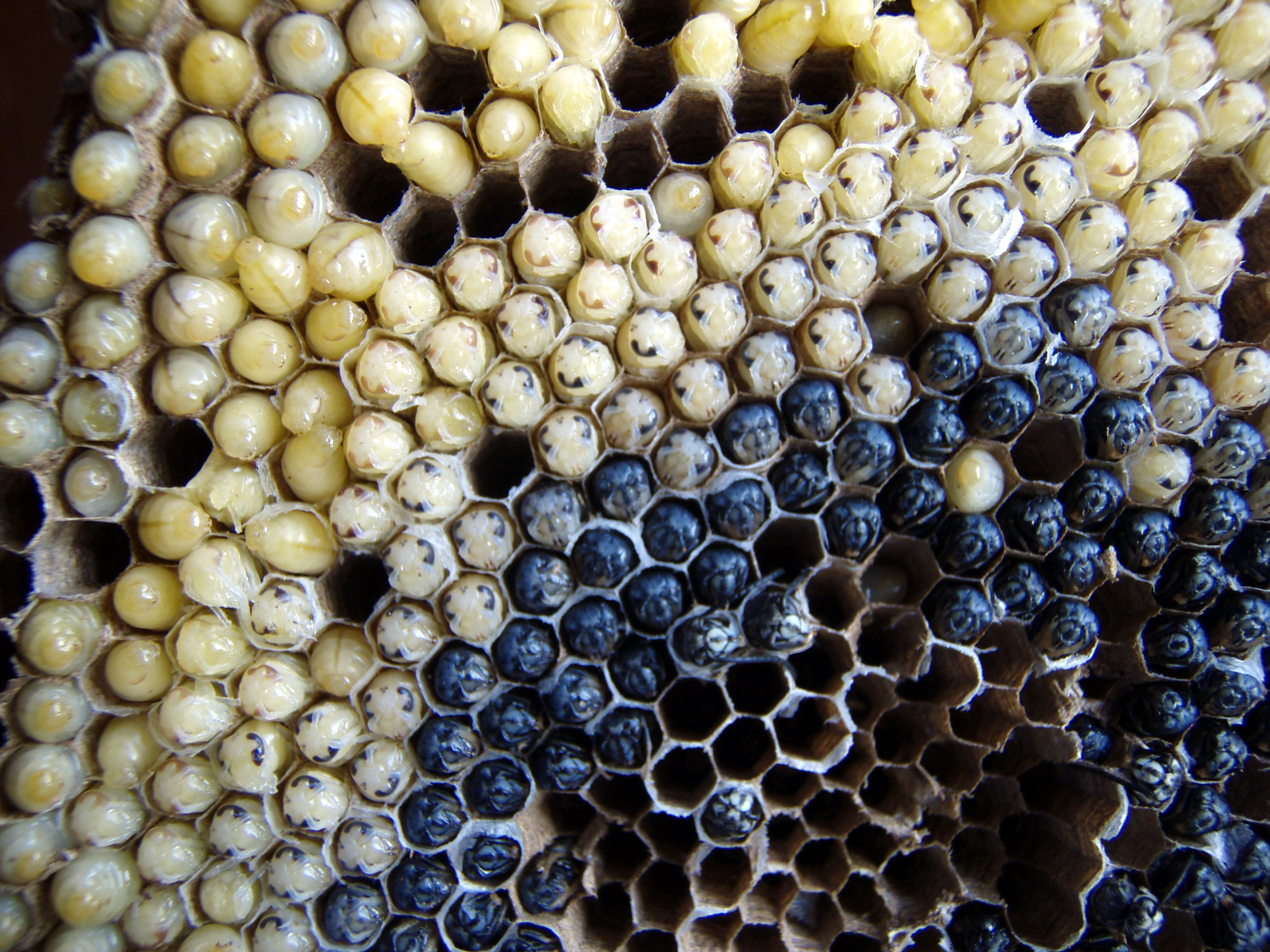
V. flaviceps hive, showing larvae and pupae. The larvae are often consumed by humans.

V. flaviceps is popular as food in Central Japan. All of its stages are consumed, but the larvae are considered a special delicacy. Small colonies may be collected and relocated into artificial hives near dwellings for the purpose of harvesting them for food. These colonies are sometimes even sheltered over the winter by humans, which benefits not only the humans but the wasps as well. This protection from the cold greatly helps their chances of survival.

In some regions of Japan, V. flaviceps is eaten in a dish with rice. In the Chubu area (including Nagano, Gifu and Aichi), a dish in which the larvae are prepared in rice is considered a delicacy. This dish is eaten during special events, especially the autumn festivals. V. flaviceps may be prepared cooked, fried, or pickled. Larvae and pupae are often taken from nests and seasoned with soy sauce, sugar, and artificial seasonings. Recently, collection of this species from inside Japan for food has decreased, and importation from Korea has increased.
