= Vespula inexspectata =

Scientific classification
- Kingdom: Animalia
- Phylum: Arthropoda
- Clade: Pancrustacea
- Class: Insecta
- Order: Hymenoptera
- Family: Vespidae
- Genus: Vespula
- Species: V. inexspectata

Binomial name
- Vespula inexspectata Eck, 1994

Species of wasp

Vespula inexspectata, the volcano yellowjacket, is a species of wasp in the family Vespidae. It was described by Regine Eck in 1994. The species is endemic to Mexico. The holotype was collected on the west slope of Popocatépetl.
