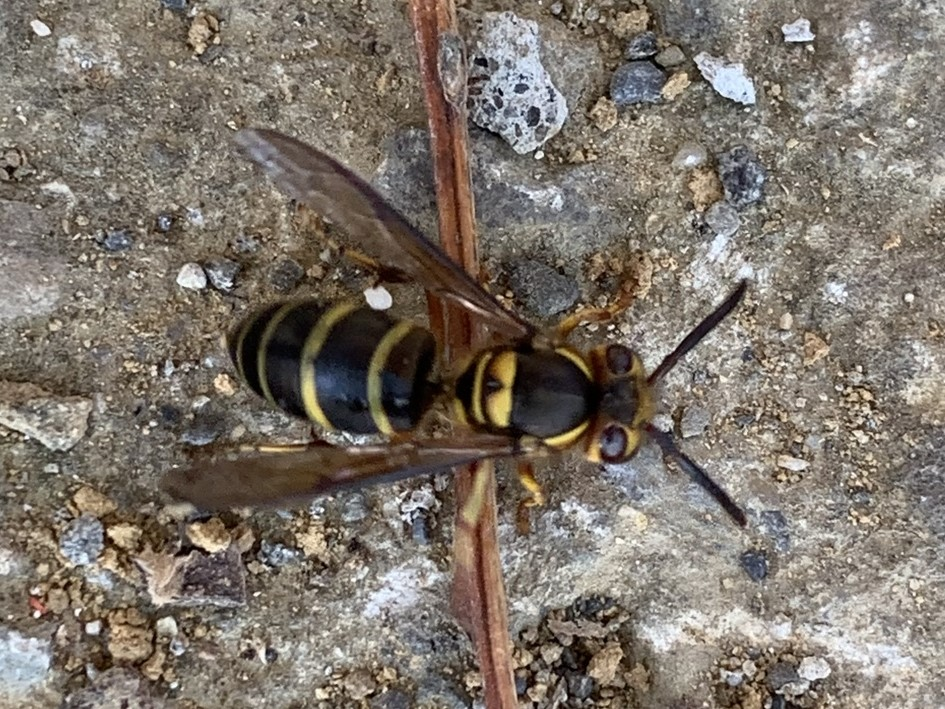

Scientific classification
- Kingdom: Animalia
- Phylum: Arthropoda
- Clade: Pancrustacea
- Class: Insecta
- Order: Hymenoptera
- Family: Vespidae
- Genus: Vespula
- Species: V. arisana

Binomial name
- Vespula arisana (Sonan, 1929)

= Vespula arisana =

Species of wasp

Vespula arisana, also known as the Taiwan yellowjacket, and Taiwan hornet, is a species of wasp in the family Vespidae. It was described by Jinhaku Sonan in 1929. The species is endemic to the island of Taiwan, where its range covers the entire island. Not much is known about the species, because of its exclusivity and endemicity.
