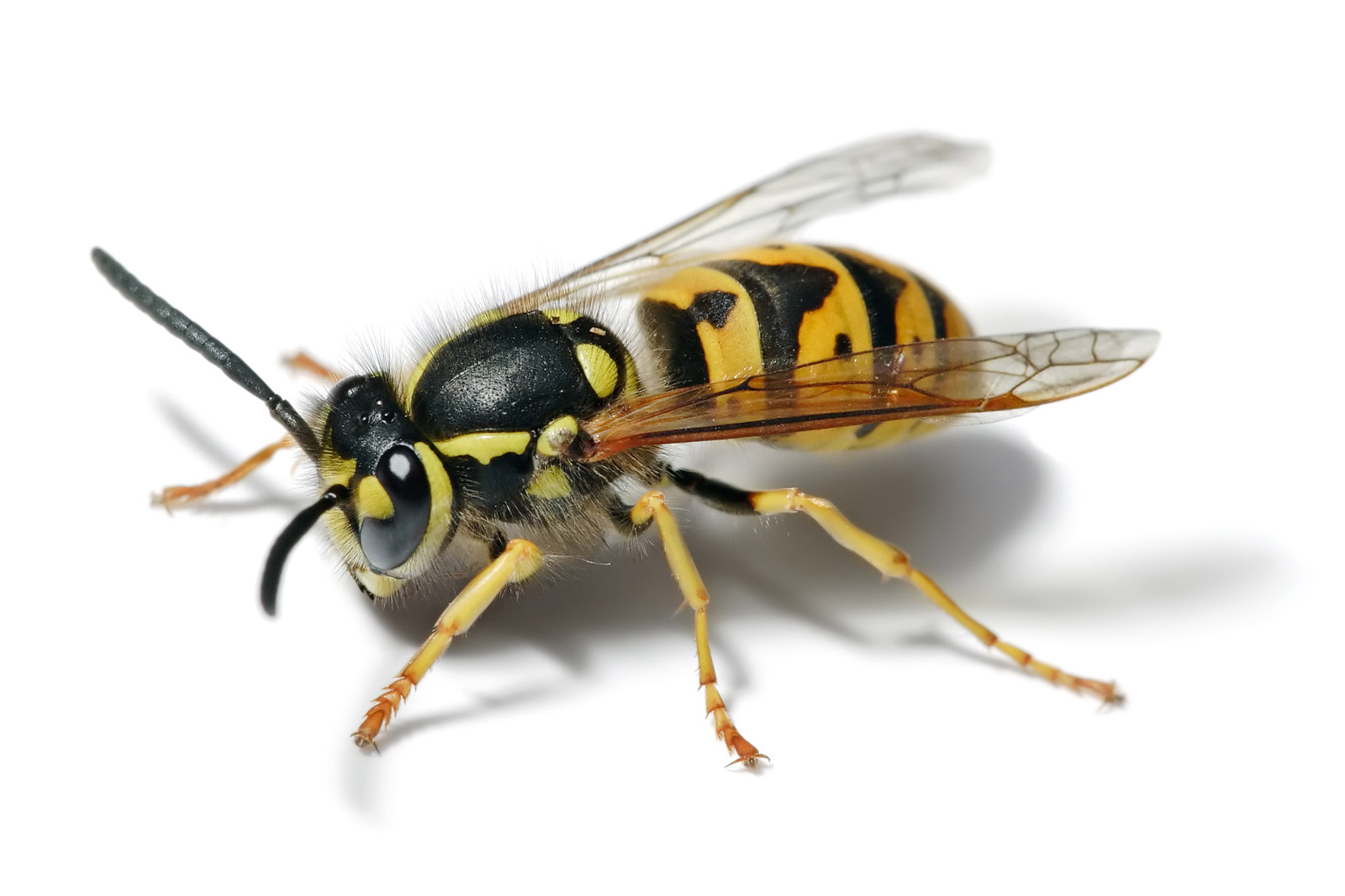
- German wasp (Vespula germanica)

Scientific classification
- Kingdom: Animalia
- Phylum: Arthropoda
- Clade: Pancrustacea
- Class: Insecta
- Order: Hymenoptera
- Family: Vespidae
- Subfamily: Vespinae
- Genus: Vespula; Thomson, 1869

Type species
- Vespa austriaca Panzer, 1799

Species
- 23 species

Synonyms
- Pseudovespa Schmiedeknecht 1881; Allovespula Blüthgen, 1943; Rugovespula Archer, 1982

= Vespula =

Genus of social wasps

Vespula is a genus of social wasps, widely distributed in the Northern Hemisphere. Along with members of their sister genus Dolichovespula, they are collectively known by the common name yellowjackets (or yellow jackets) in North America. Vespula species have a shorter oculomalar space (shown in the figure below right) and a more pronounced tendency to nest underground than Dolichovespula.

== Notable species ==
- While most species of this genus inhabit North America, four Vespula species inhabit Europe, namely V. austriaca, V. germanica, V. rufa, and V. vulgaris.
- Two common European species, the German wasp (V. germanica) and the common wasp (V. vulgaris), have established in other countries; both species are now found in New Zealand, Australia, and South America, while the former has also been introduced in South America, and the latter in Southern Africa.
- The eastern yellowjacket (V. maculifrons) and western yellowjacket (V. pensylvanica) are native to North America.

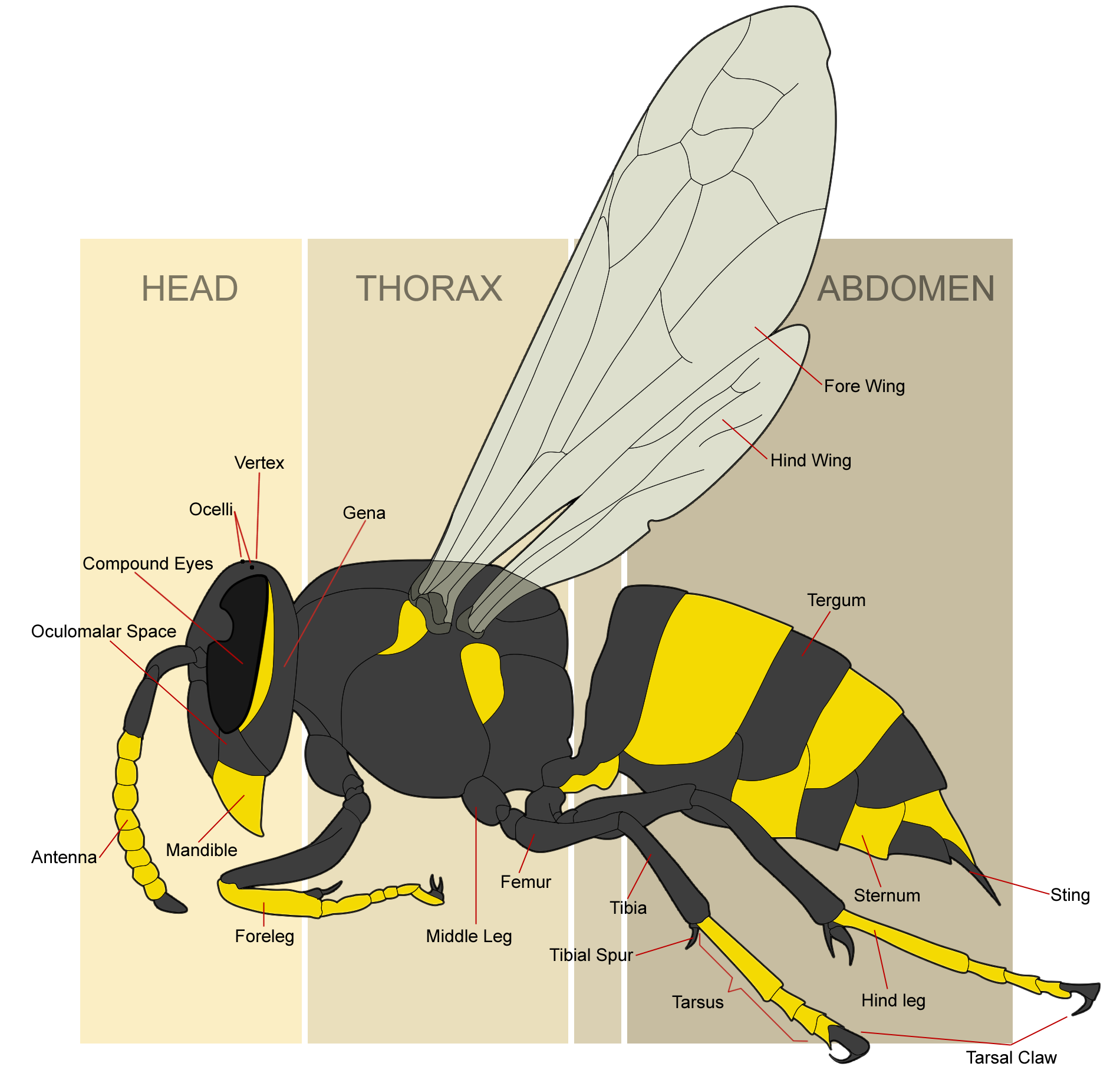
Illustration showing oculomalar space

== Species ==
- Vespula acadica (Sladen, 1918) – forest yellowjacket
- Vespula akrei Landolt, 2010
- Vespula alascensis Packard, 1870 – Alaska yellowjacket
- Vespula arisana (Sonan, 1929) – Taiwan yellowjacket
- Vespula atropilosa (Sladen, 1918) – prairie yellowjacket
- Vespula austriaca (Panzer, 1799) – red cuckoo wasp
- Vespula consobrina (Saussure, 1854) – blackjacket
- Vespula flaviceps (Smith, 1870)
- Vespula flavopilosa Jacobson, 1978 – downy yellowjacket
- Vespula germanica (Fabricius, 1793) – German wasp, German yellowjacket
- Vespula inexspectata Eck, 1991 – volcano yellowjacket
- Vespula infernalis (Saussure, 1854) – cuckoo yellowjacket
- Vespula ingrica Birula, 1931 – grey yellowjacket
- Vespula intermedia (Buysson, 1904–05) – northern red-banded yellowjacket
- Vespula kingdonwardi Archer, 1981
- Vespula koreensis (Rad., 1887)
- Vespula maculifrons (Buysson, 1905) – eastern yellowjacket
- Vespula nursei Archer, 1981
- Vespula orbata (Buysson 1902)
- Vespula pensylvanica (Saussure, 1857) – western yellowjacket
- Vespula rufa (Linnaeus, 1758) – red wasp
- Vespula shidai Ish., Yam., Wagn., 1980
- Vespula squamosa (Drury, 1770) – southern yellowjacket
- Vespula structor (Smith, 1870)
- Vespula sulphurea (Saussure, 1854) – California yellowjacket
- Vespula vidua (Saussure, 1854) – long yellowjacket or widow yellowjacket
- Vespula vulgaris (Linnaeus, 1758) – common wasp, common yellowjacket

See also:

- Paravespula, a subgenus of Vespula

== Venom ==
The venom of Vespula is mostly composed of antigen 5, hyaluronidase, and phospholipase. (Note: p. 306, "Yellowjacket venom consists mainly of three proteins: antigen 5, hyaluronidase, and phospholipase.")

=== Immunology ===
A high degree of similarity occurs between immunogenic fractions of different Vespula species. (Note: p. 307, "The venom phospholipases isolated from the three species of yellowjackets in this report were found to be immunochemically indistinguishable from each other using sera from rabbits immunized with venom from a single species of yellowjacket. Similar findings were obtained with antigen 5.") (Note: p. 304, "Identical concentrations of phospholipase-specific antibodies were obtained with immunosorbents containing phospholipase from any of the three species of yellowjackets. This was also the case for antigen 5-specific antibodies. ... The above results indicate that antigen 5s as well as phospholipases from these three species of yellowjackets are antigenically indistinguishable. The findings were confirmed by immunodiffusion. Lines of identity were observed when antigen 5s, or phospholipases, from the three species of yellowjackets were tested with rabbit anti-serum specific for V. maculifrons venom (results not shown).") Rabbit serum antibodies are unable to distinguish between them.
