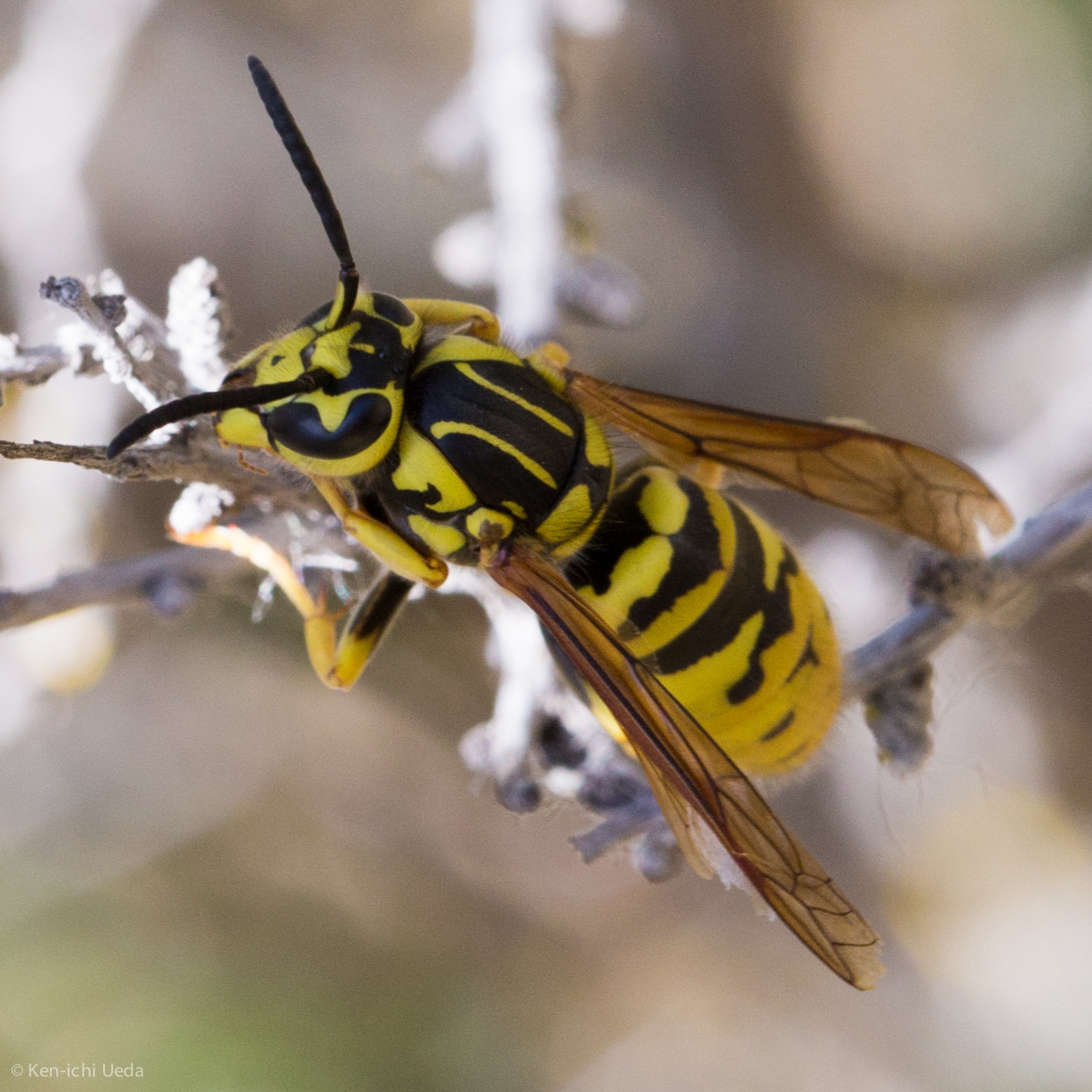

Scientific classification
- Kingdom: Animalia
- Phylum: Arthropoda
- Clade: Pancrustacea
- Class: Insecta
- Order: Hymenoptera
- Family: Vespidae
- Genus: Vespula
- Species: V. sulphurea

Binomial name
- Vespula sulphurea (de Saussure, 1854)

= Vespula sulphurea =

Species of wasp

Vespula sulphurea, the California yellowjacket, is a species of wasp within the family Vespidae. It is found distributed in the Upper Sonoran Fauna of California, but has been known to occur in southern Oregon, western Nevada, southern Arizona, and northern Baja California. Nests of the species are found underground, with a maximum known worker count of 1,100. It is preyed upon by the California scrub jay and spiders in the Peucetia genus. It feeds and pollinates on plants such as fennel, California figwort, and the chaparral broom.
