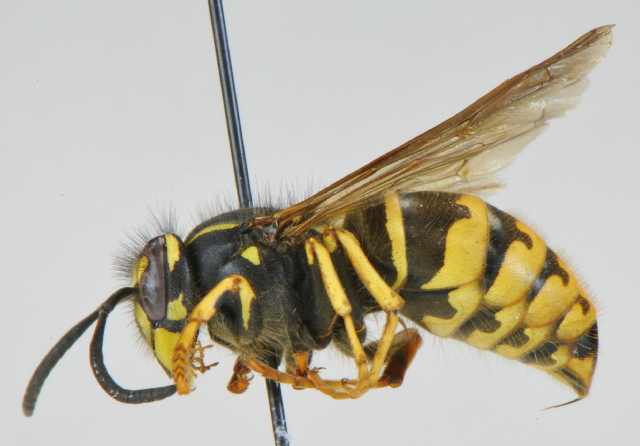

Scientific classification
- Kingdom: Animalia
- Phylum: Arthropoda
- Clade: Pancrustacea
- Class: Insecta
- Order: Hymenoptera
- Family: Vespidae
- Genus: Vespula
- Species: V. alascensis

Binomial name
- Vespula alascensis Packard, 1870

= Vespula alascensis =

Alaska yellowjacket

Species of yellowjacket

Vespula alascensis, also referred to as Alaska yellowjacket or American yellowjacket, is a species of yellowjacket that inhabits North America. Although it was named in 1870, it was, until 2010, treated as a taxonomic synonym of a related species, Vespula vulgaris, but is now recognized as a distinct taxon. Generally it nests in the ground.
