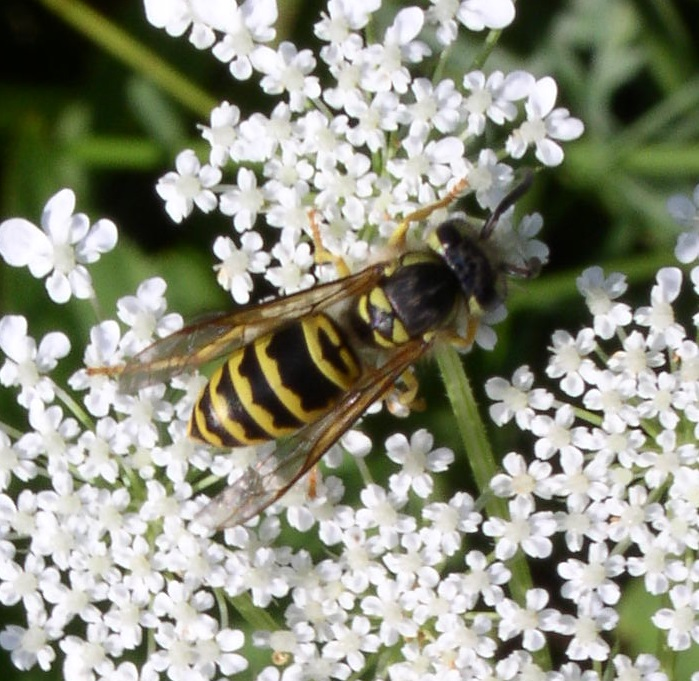

Scientific classification
- Kingdom: Animalia
- Phylum: Arthropoda
- Clade: Pancrustacea
- Class: Insecta
- Order: Hymenoptera
- Family: Vespidae
- Genus: Vespula
- Species: V. maculifrons

Binomial name
- Vespula maculifrons (Buysson, 1905)

Synonyms
- Vespa maculifrons Harris, 1853 (Nom. Nud.); Vespa communis Saussure, 1857 (Preocc.); Vespa maculifrons Buysson, 1905; Vespa communis var. flavida Sladen, 1918; Vespula flavida (Sladen, 1918); Vespula inexspectata Eck, 1994; Vespula inexpectata Landolt et al., 2010 (Missp.)

= Eastern yellowjacket =

Species of insect

The eastern yellowjacket (eastern yellow jacket; Vespula maculifrons) is a wasp found in eastern North America. Although most of their nests are subterranean, they are often considered a pest due to their nesting in recreational areas and buildings. This yellow jacket is a social insect, living in colonies of hundreds to thousands of individuals. Along with their subfamily, Vespinae, this species demonstrates supportive parental care for offspring, separation of reproductive and sterile castes, and overlapping generations. They aggressively defend their nests from threats and are known to inflict painful stings.

== Taxonomy and phylogenetics ==
V. maculifrons, in the family Vespidae and the subfamily Vespinae, is commonly found throughout the Northern Hemisphere as part of the yellowjackets. For example, V. maculifrons is commonly called the eastern yellowjacket and has the black and yellow color that distinguishes the yellowjackets. The specific name maculifrons is derived from the Latin word macula, which means spot, and frons, which means forehead. This refers to the spots on the head of species, which are another distinguishing characteristic. Like other Vespula species, V. maculifrons is a social wasp, so participates in cooperative brood care and division between reproductive and nonreproductive groups.

== Description and identification ==
V. maculifrons can be differentiated from other wasp species due to its smaller size and abdominal pattern. The most recognizable features of V. maculifrons are the black and yellow lines on the head, thorax, and abdomen. While the body is curved and wider than the head, the abdomen narrows at its attachment to the thorax, which is thinner than the abdomen. The lines on the abdomen also differ based on caste, with the queens having one flared black line nearest the thorax followed by thinner black lines. Queens also have two black dots between each black line. Individuals of this species range in size from 12.7–15.9 mm (0.5–0.625 in). and weigh roughly 0.0014 oz (0.04 g). The queens are the largest, followed by the males, and then the workers. A V. maculifrons nest can range from 94–300 mm (3.7–11.8 in) in diameter, allowing for hundreds to thousands of workers inside. A large nest can contain 10,000 to 15,000 cells, with a little less than a third of them dedicated to the larger queen cells. The envelope of the nest is tan-brown to red-orange in color. It is constructed out of worn, decaying wood, which results in a fragile structure. These nests are typically subterranean, but have been found in various sites above ground, including buildings.

== Distribution and habitat ==
V. maculifrons is commonly found throughout eastern North America, extending as far as the Great Plains. In most areas where it is found, it is the most common yellowjacket species. In the spring, the queen selects where to locate the colony. Their subterranean nests are not deep, usually covered by less than 50 mm (2 in) of soil. However, nests have been found at depths ranging from just under the surface to 250 mm (9.8 in) deep. These nests are found in hardwood forests and on creek banks, as well as in urban and suburban areas. Within these areas, nests are typically built in sheltered places, which can include underground areas, tree stumps, and attics. Their nests are so frequently found in recreational and residential areas that they are considered a pest.

The queen begins constructing and the initial structure of the nest by chewing wood and adding in saliva to make a quick-drying pulp to assemble the paper nest with. The first part of the nest constructed is the stalk, which eventually narrows into a cord before expanding again to form the first hexagonal cell. Other cells are then added to the sides of this first cell and an envelope is built around this first group of cells to form a miniature comb. The queen lays eggs in these cells and, once hatched, these become workers. As soon as these workers emerge, the nest begins to enlarge rapidly.

As more cells are added, the comb grows quickly, and once there are enough cells on the first comb, a second comb is added, and so on. To make room for more cells, the inner layers of the envelope are re-chewed and used to create additional layers outside the nest. As most nests are underground, the cavity is enlarged by removing and dropping soil outside the nest.

== Venom ==
Vespulakinins were first discovered in V. maculifrons. Yoshida et al 1976 discovered several of these bradykinin-like peptides including vespulakinin 1 and vespulakinin 2. They and the entire vespulakinin family are insecticidal and may prove useful for human purpose.

Hymenoptera, the order (wasps, bees, ants, and sawflies) to which V. maculifrons belongs, is the leading cause of anaphylaxis in humans. Reactions are usually triggered by proteins in the venom.

== Colony cycle ==
A colony consists of three types of individuals in a social group - queens, workers, and males. New colonies are founded annually during the spring. This is determined by location, but typically occurs around May or June in the northern regions and around September in southern regions. Due to the seasonal differences, the northern cycle is typically shorter than in the south, resulting in smaller nest sizes. A queen, which mated earlier in the year and spent the winter in diapause, founds a colony by raising the first group of workers. Until the first offspring emerge as adults, the lone queen lays eggs, forages for food, cares for the young, and defends the nest. These workers maintain and expand the nest when they mature, while the queen continues to produce more offspring. The workers' job is to build 850 to 9700 cells, of which about 30% are dedicated to queen cells. When these queen cells begin to be constructed, the nest is said to have matured. In the north, colonies peak around August or September, while southern colonies tend to peak around October to November. When winter comes, the colony dies and only some of the queens survive to begin a new colony the next nesting cycle.

== Behavior ==
=== Communication ===
For V. maculifrons workers to communicate with others in the nest about a potential predator, they have an alarm pheromone that stimulates defense. This pheromone is linked to the sting apparatus and prompts attraction and attack. When the alarm pheromone is expressed, wasps around the nest entrance are typically seen circling, outlining a zigzagging flight, and going directly towards the target. However, foragers that were not at the nest when the pheromone was expressed do not respond in a similar manner. The facultative social parasite of V. maculifrons, Vespula squamosa, responds to the alarm response of V. maculifrons, suggesting common chemistry between pheromones. Since V. squamosa is known to take over nests of V. maculifrons, selection for V. squamosa favors the ability to recognize and respond to alarm calls within the nest.

=== Mating behavior ===
==== Male/male interactions ====
Males of V. maculifrons tend to form loose aggregations, resembling leks, during mating. In one area, hundreds to thousands of males patrol prominent trees and bushes by constantly flying around them. Males typically patrol large areas randomly, rather than limiting to a few trees. If a male sees a female while patrolling, he flies closer to the female in a zigzag fashion and stops on a nearby leaf. This then allows the male to climb onto the female's gaster from behind. Other males do not try to approach an ongoing copulation, but a male might try to copulate immediately after. If a second mating occurs, sperm competition may favor the second male. As a result, males can prevent competition from another male by elongating copulation.

==== Female/male interactions ====
A queen can mate 48 hours after emerging from the pupal stage. To find a male, queens fly to trees and bushes where males gather in groups. Males frequently groom their legs, antennae, and gasters throughout courtship, mating, and after contact with a queen. The queens have also been seen to groom the face and antennae, but only briefly. At the end of copulation, a queen is able to produce an olfactory or contact pheromone to signal release to the male. The queen also begins to nibble the dorsal surface of the male's gaster to further signal the end of copulation.

Since both queens and males can mate multiple times, it is advantageous for the queen to signal when her spermatheca is full, thereby preventing the waste of resources and time. Having strong genital locks for mating is also advantageous for males due to male-male competition, but it can cause problems during disengagement. In the laboratory, both females and males have died during disengagement, sometimes leaving reproductive parts attached to the opposite sex.

== Kin selection ==
=== Genetic relatedness within colonies ===
As a social species, V. maculifrons colonies depend on collaboration. However, polyandry tends to create subfamilies with lower relatedness, which can lead to conflict within the colony. Yet, V. maculifrons queens, and many other species’ queens, mate multiply. This occurrence is explained because potential conflict between subfamilies is offset by the reproductive success of queens; the mate number of queens is correlated to the number of queen cells a colony creates. This phenomenon may occur due to higher genetic diversity, which could lead to genetically varying workers that are more efficient at their jobs.

=== Kin recognition and discrimination ===
As seen in many social insects, cuticular lipids are a source of communication among adults. In general, cuticular lipids function to avoid dehydration by acting as a seal to keep moisture in. However, the hydrocarbons on the surface of cuticular lipids can also serve in identifying the individual's species, and more importantly, kin. Kin recognition occurs because each species has a unique cuticular hydrocarbon composition. However, the composition between V. maculifrons and V. squamosa is very similar. This occurrence is advantageous to V. squamosa because the species is a social parasite of V. maculifrons, and their similar hydrocarbon compositions can act as a chemical camouflage to help V. squamosa parasitize nests. Also, minor differences occur between the cuticular hydrocarbon compositions of workers and queens.

=== Worker queen conflict ===
When queen cell construction begins in late August to early September, it is in the male's best interest to mate with a queen and produce a gyne. Similar wasp species illustrate workers that help their own kin or harm nonrelatives from growing as a gyne. Thus, reproductive competition occurs so that the genes of specific subfamilies can be passed on and survive. However, no evidence of reproductive competition exists within V. maculifrons colonies. Although a second male may occasionally attempt to grasp a queen immediately after copulation with another male, postcopulatory sperm competition is not common. In addition, reproductive skew among males is low.

== Life history and survivorship curves ==
Towards the end of the seasonal cycle, the gynes mate with multiple males. Then, around November to December, the colony begins to senesce. At this point, the queens undergo diapause, which is a dormancy period to avoid the adverse environmental conditions of winter. Few queens survive winter to start a new colony in the spring. Queens that survive winter typically exhibit larger overall body size, as well as a thin shape. However, specific genotypes and previous mating does not affect queen survival during this period.

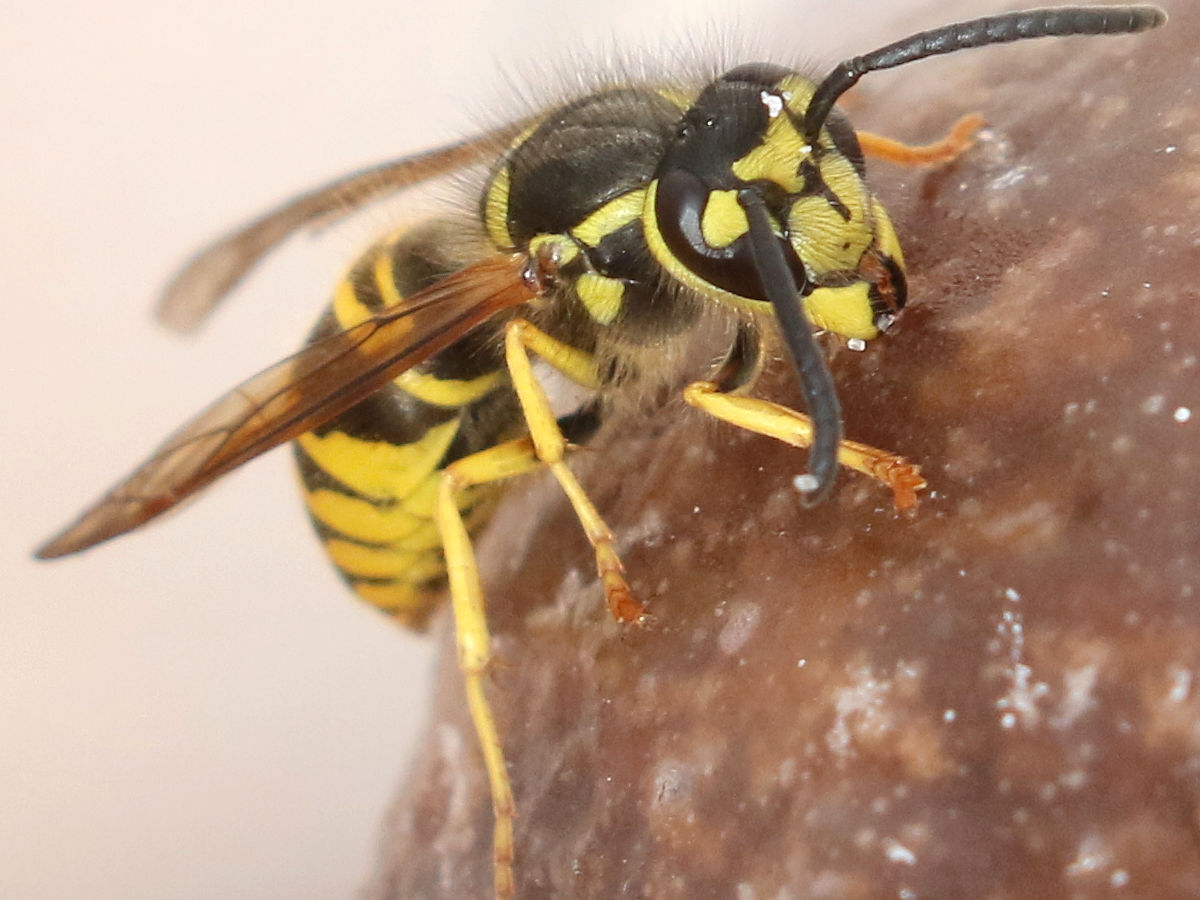
Licking sugar from a donut hole at Russell R. Kirt Prairie, Illinois

== Interaction with other species ==
=== Diet ===
V. maculifrons is a polyphagous species, meaning that they feed on a variety of foods. The number of trips a worker makes to forage depends on the age of the worker, as well as the size of the nest, since more food is necessary to feed a larger nest. Workers dedicated to foraging are capable of olfactory learning, allowing them to distinguish odors specific to food. Workers use this ability to scavenge for dead insects such as earwigs and fall webworm larvae, as well as live arthropods. They are also frugivores, obtaining carbohydrates from fruits, nectar, and honeydew. Workers go to flowers in an attempt to catch insects, but often end up feeding on nectar and pollinating the flower while doing so. They feed on honeydew, which is a sweet, sticky liquid. However, honeydew is susceptible to fermentation, causing individuals that feed on it to become inebriated and unable to fly or walk. Since this species is attracted to sugar sources, they may be attracted to soft drinks or other foods consumed by humans. Adults feed larvae with a chewed paste made from other insects and carrion.

=== Predators ===
V. maculifrons has many predators; most are mammals much larger than the wasps, such as raccoons, black bears, and skunks. Raccoons have been found to be one of the main predators in Georgia and Indiana. To consume the colony, raccoons dig to uncover the nest, distribute brood cells, and finally scrape individual broods away from the cell using their teeth. Dolichovespula maculata is another predator of V. maculifrons and other yellowjacket species. Predation of V. maculifrons may occur over other wasp species due to the shallow depths and fragile envelopes of their nests.

=== Parasites ===
Vespula squamosa is a common parasite of V. maculifrons, though they are facultative, which means they can live both independently and parasitically. Roughly 80% of V. squamosa colonies are parasitic, which can be determined if any V. maculifrons workers are present or if the nest itself has the characteristics of a V. maculifrons nest, such as its typical small, tan cells. However, parasitic colonies were not as frequent in areas of unobstructed forest. In the colonies that do become parasitic, a V. squamosa queen forcibly takes control of the nest from the host queen. Then, the host colony's workers raise the first brood of V. squamosa, until their own workers are mature. Eventually, all V. maculifrons workers will die out.

=== Commensals ===
Commensalism, whereby one organism benefits from living on or with another organism without causing harm, occurs in two species of muscid flies: Fannia canicularis, which is commonly known as the lesser house fly, and Dendrophaonia querceti. The females of both species lay their eggs directly on the outer portion of the nest envelope. When the eggs hatch, the larvae fall into the soil below the nest, where waste products and debris also accumulate. The larvae feed on this waste, thereby preventing it from building up under the nest.

== Economic importance ==
Eastern yellow jackets destroy many insects that feed on cultivated and ornamental plants, providing a valuable biological pest control service to humans. However, this species can itself be a nuisance when their nests are located near homes. They are adept at stinging, especially if their nest is threatened. Unlike certain bees that die after inflicting a single sting, these wasps can sting repeatedly whenever they feel it is necessary, and their sting is very painful.
