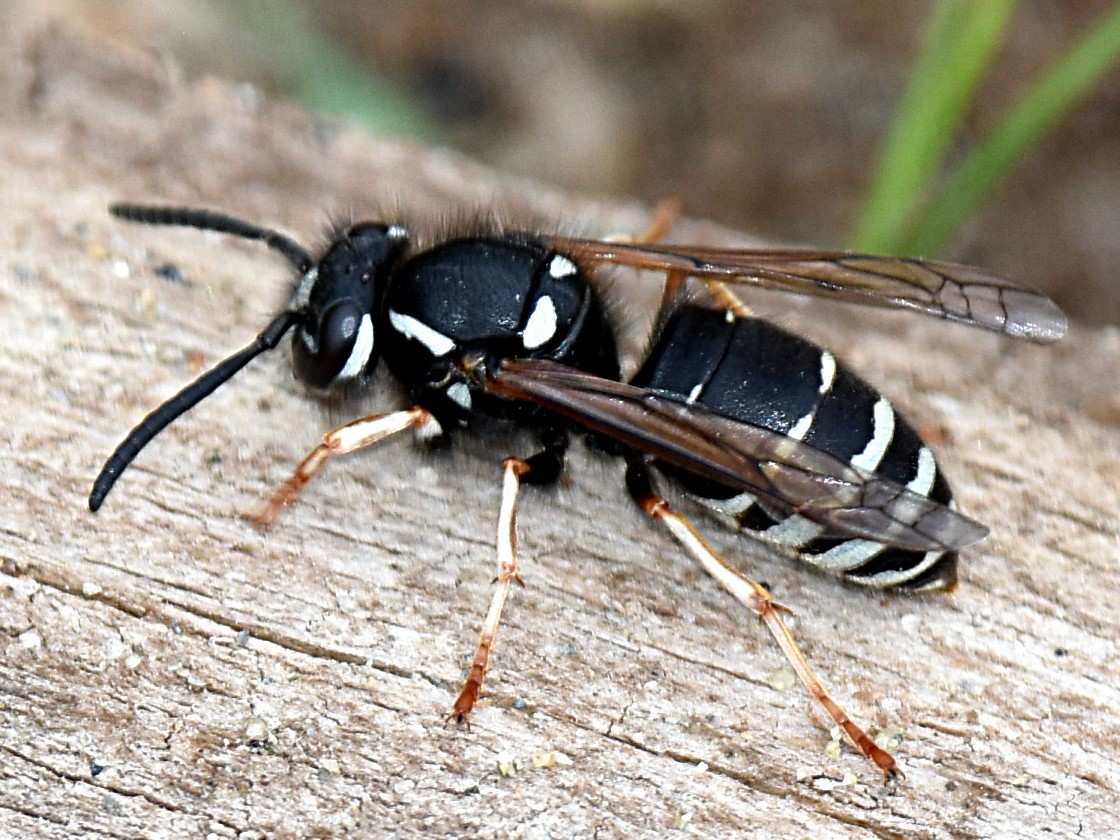

Scientific classification
- Kingdom: Animalia
- Phylum: Arthropoda
- Clade: Pancrustacea
- Class: Insecta
- Order: Hymenoptera
- Family: Vespidae
- Genus: Vespula
- Species: V. consobrina

Binomial name
- Vespula consobrina (Saussure)

= Vespula consobrina =

Species of wasp

Vespula consobrina, commonly known as the blackjacket (not to be confused with Dolichovespula maculata, which is also called “blackjacket”), is a species of stinging wasp in the family Vespidae, which includes multiple cousin species in the northern hemisphere, such as the German yellowjacket and other social wasps.

== Appearance ==
Queen blackjackets are 17mm in size, while female workers are 10-12mm and males 15-16mm. Blackjacket wasps can easily be identified in the wild by their distinct black and white striped pattern on their abdomen and the white and black coloration.

== Habitat and distribution ==
Blackjackets can be found in all of Canada except Nunavut and in the northern states of the United States. They usually build their nests in abandoned rodent burrows, rotten or fallen trees, and hollow walls and rock cavities. They mostly stay in forested areas, and they rarely come into contact with people.
