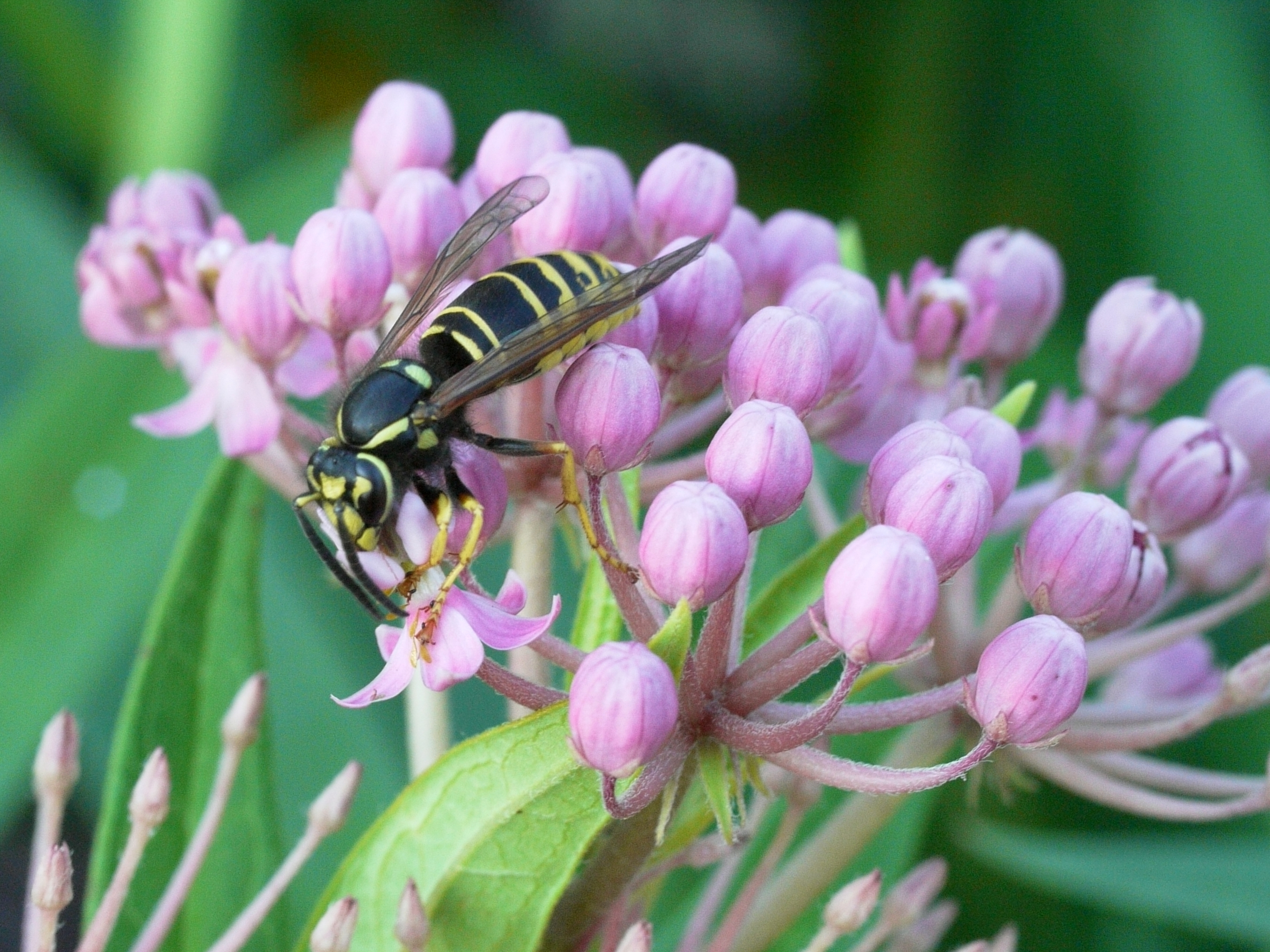

Scientific classification
- Kingdom: Animalia
- Phylum: Arthropoda
- Clade: Pancrustacea
- Class: Insecta
- Order: Hymenoptera
- Family: Vespidae
- Genus: Vespula
- Species: V. vidua

Binomial name
- Vespula vidua (de Saussure, 1854)

= Vespula vidua =

Species of wasp

Vespula vidua, known generally as the long yellowjacket or widow yellowjacket, is a species of stinging wasp in the family Vespidae.
