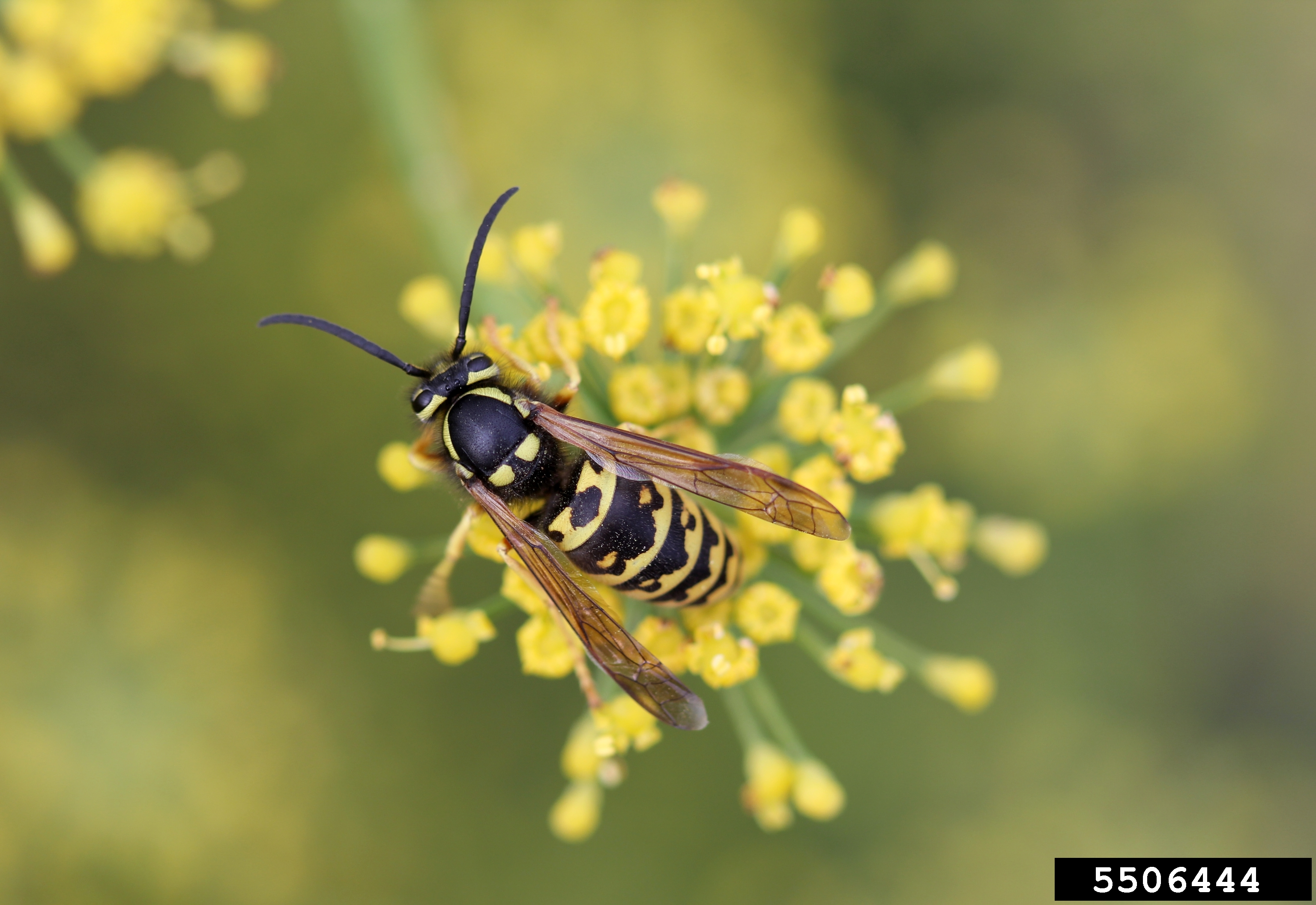
- Vespula atropilosa queen feeding on pollen in Fort Collins, CO

Conservation status
- Data Deficient (IUCN 3.1)

Scientific classification
- Domain: Eukaryota
- Kingdom: Animalia
- Phylum: Arthropoda
- Class: Insecta
- Order: Hymenoptera
- Family: Vespidae
- Genus: Vespula
- Species: V. atropilosa

Binomial name
- Vespula atropilosa Sladan, 1918; Miller, 1961
- Distribution of Vespula atropilosa

= Vespula atropilosa =

Species of wasp

Vespula atropilosa, also known as the prairie yellowjacket, is a black and yellow social wasp that forms annual colonies. Vespula atropilosa was formerly a member of the Vespa family. Males have either xanthic (yellow) or melanic (black) abdominal coloring. The prairie yellowjacket can be found in the Western and Midwestern United States as well as parts of southern Canada. It builds its nests underground and prefers large open areas such as pastures and golf courses. Vespula atropilosa colonies are founded by a queen in the spring and grow most during mid-summer. It preys on other insects such as flies and grasshoppers but is not a scavenger like other wasps. Queens mate with multiple males, and males will fight each other for matings. V. atropilosa is a social wasp that practices altruism. Prairie yellowjackets are not considered pests but are commonly found in backyards in the Pacific Northwest. This species derives its common name from the prairies and grasslands where it can be found.

== Taxonomy and phylogeny ==
The taxonomic status of Vespula atropilosa has been variable. V. atropilosa has not always been accepted as its own species. Bequaert (1931) considered it to be a xanthic form of Vespula rufa. Bohart and Bechtel (1957) considered it a subspecies of Vespula rufa but Miller (1961) recognized it as a unique species.

The prairie yellowjacket was formerly known as Vespa atropilosa before being moved to the genus Vespula.

V. atropilosa is a member of the genus Vespula which comprises most yellowjackets. Yellowjackets are named for their characteristic yellow and black markings. They usually have minimal hair and translucent golden-colored wings. Vespula are found all over the world. They may act as pollinators for plants such as orchids, rhododendrons, squash, common milkweed, field garlic, and field pussytoes.

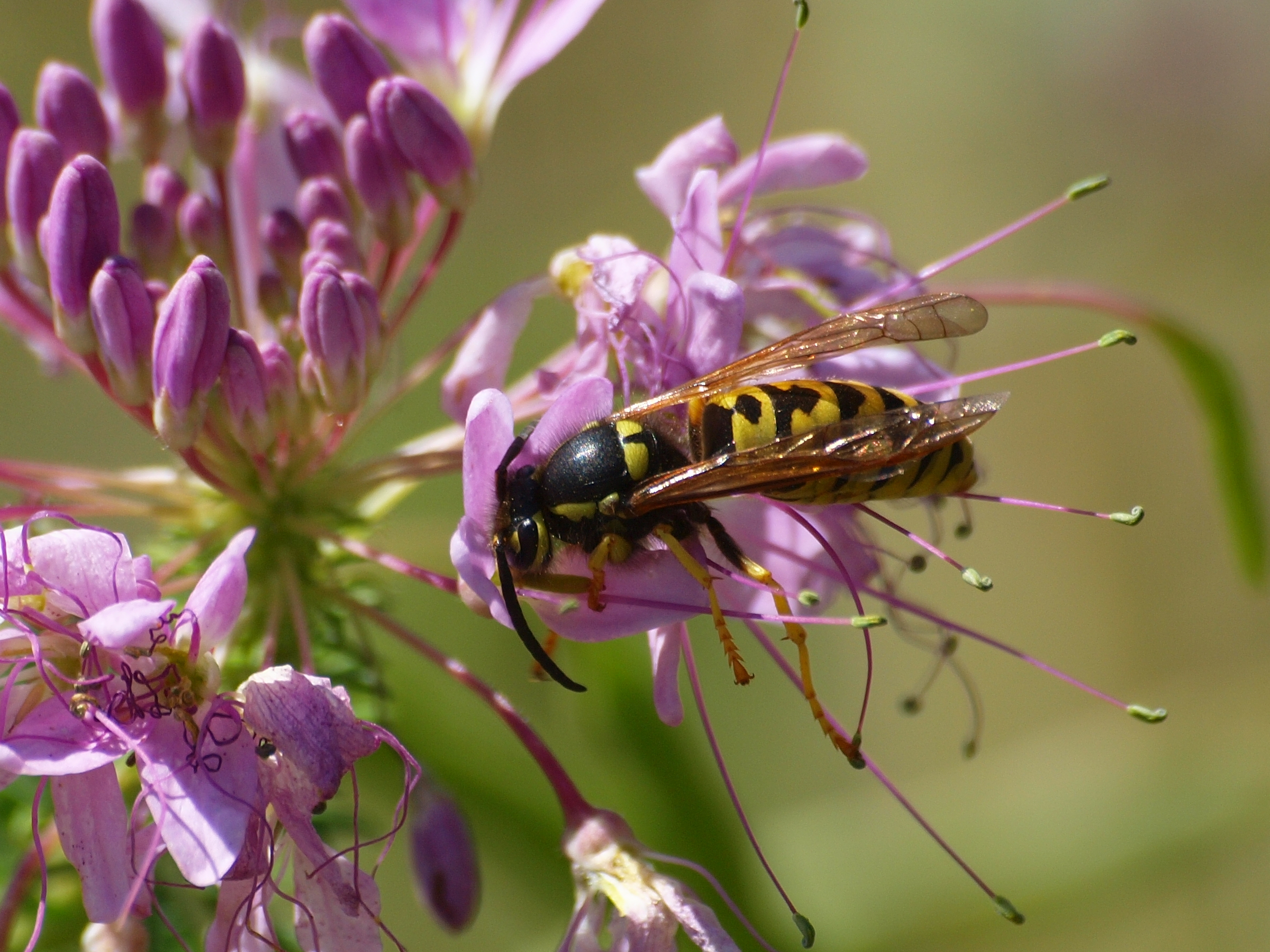

== Description and identification ==
Vespula atropilosa is a black and yellow wasp. It ranges from 10 to 15 mm in size. In some places males have two different abdominal patterns of coloring: one with less black than yellow (xanthic) and the other with less yellow than black (melanic). Regarding the head, the malar or zygomatic space is less than half as long as the penultimate segment of the antenna, the occipital carina is incomplete, and the ventral section of the scape is yellow and the dorsal section of the scape is black. Regarding the body, the metasomal tergites are covered with long straight hair, the black central region of the apex of the second gastral tergum is pointed, and the male aedeagus is saddle-shaped.

== Distribution and habitat ==
Vespula atropilosa is found in western North America in Canada and the United States. More specifically it is found in the Western and Midwestern United States ranging from Seattle to Arizona and in parts of southern Canada such as Alberta and British Columbia. It has also been found as far east as Wisconsin and Illinois. V. atropilosa inhabits prairie and grassland habitats.

=== Nests ===
Nests are typically subterranean and found in open areas such as dry fields and pastures. Nests are located on both flat and sloped terrain. Most nests are settled in preexisting rodent burrows. V. atropilosa often continue to excavate unused rodent tunnels in order to expand the nest. Nests are located relatively close to the ground surface, ranging from 3–23 cm below the soil surface. Nests located on slopes are located deeper underground. Queens choose remote edges of rodent burrows to establish nests. Majority of colonies have a single entrance and tunnel. Nests range from around 550 to 2,200 cells and average 1,200 cells in size. Nests possess a single comb containing worker cells which is located above the queen cells.

Nests are made of envelope paper which is strong and flexible. Fiber strips are positioned in a horizontal pattern. A variety of fiber sources are used and results in different colored strips of paper. The two primary sources of fibers are weathered wood and scraps from non-woody plants.

== Colony cycle ==
=== Colony establishment ===
Vespula atropilosa queens emerge in late April and early May. They search for new nesting sites when the weather is warm. The hibernation location of the queen determines at what point in the spring she becomes active. Queens in more sheltered locations become active later in the spring when the weather is warmer. While searching for potential nest sites, queens will also visit flowers to obtain nectar. Queens will fly 20–40 cm above ground and will frequently stop to investigate burrows and holes in the ground in order to locate the optimal nesting site. The queen may spend anywhere from 2 to 30 minutes inspecting each burrow. Only a few queens are successful in establishing nests. Successful queens hang a pedicel of fibers on roots clinging to the roof of the burrow about 15–20 cm from the entrance. A small envelope is built and then cell construction commences. Queens will rear between 4 and 9 workers on their own. After this, the queen remains in the nest and these workers take over foraging duties.

=== Colony growth ===
The number of workers in a colony increases over the summer months with worker cell construction being greatest in early July. By the end of June there are about 100 worker cells, and in early July there are 200-300 cells with a maximum of 700-900 by the end of July. There is a switch from worker cell construction to queen cell construction in the beginning of July, and queen cell construction is greatest in late July. By early August, the nest will contain 2-3 queen cell combs but never more than 3. In mature nests, the number of queen cells ranges from 200 to 900 cells.

=== Colony growth by developmental stages ===
Eggs: In mid-June, V. atropilosa colonies contain around 25 eggs. The number of eggs increases greatly in July and declines in early August. In August, there few eggs are found in the colony and the remaining eggs are located in queen cells. Egg production typically ends near the end of August. Larvae: Colonies contain around 35 larvae in mid-June. Numbers of larvae are greatest in mid-July but decrease by late August. In mid-August, colonies contain 200-400 larvae. By late August the number drops to 6-200 larvae which are found in queen cells and by September there were very few larvae remaining. Pupae: By mid-June, colonies contain about 20 pupae. The peak number of pupae occurs in late July and early August but declines greatly by the end of August. In mid-August, colonies may contain between 400 and 700 pupae. Pupae numbers are very low in September. Adults: Adult males begin to emerge during the final week of July, with peak emergence occurring in early to mid-August. Adult queens emerge later in the summer. They begin to emerge the first week of August, and peak emergence is from mid-August to early September. After September, very few queens can be found in colonies.

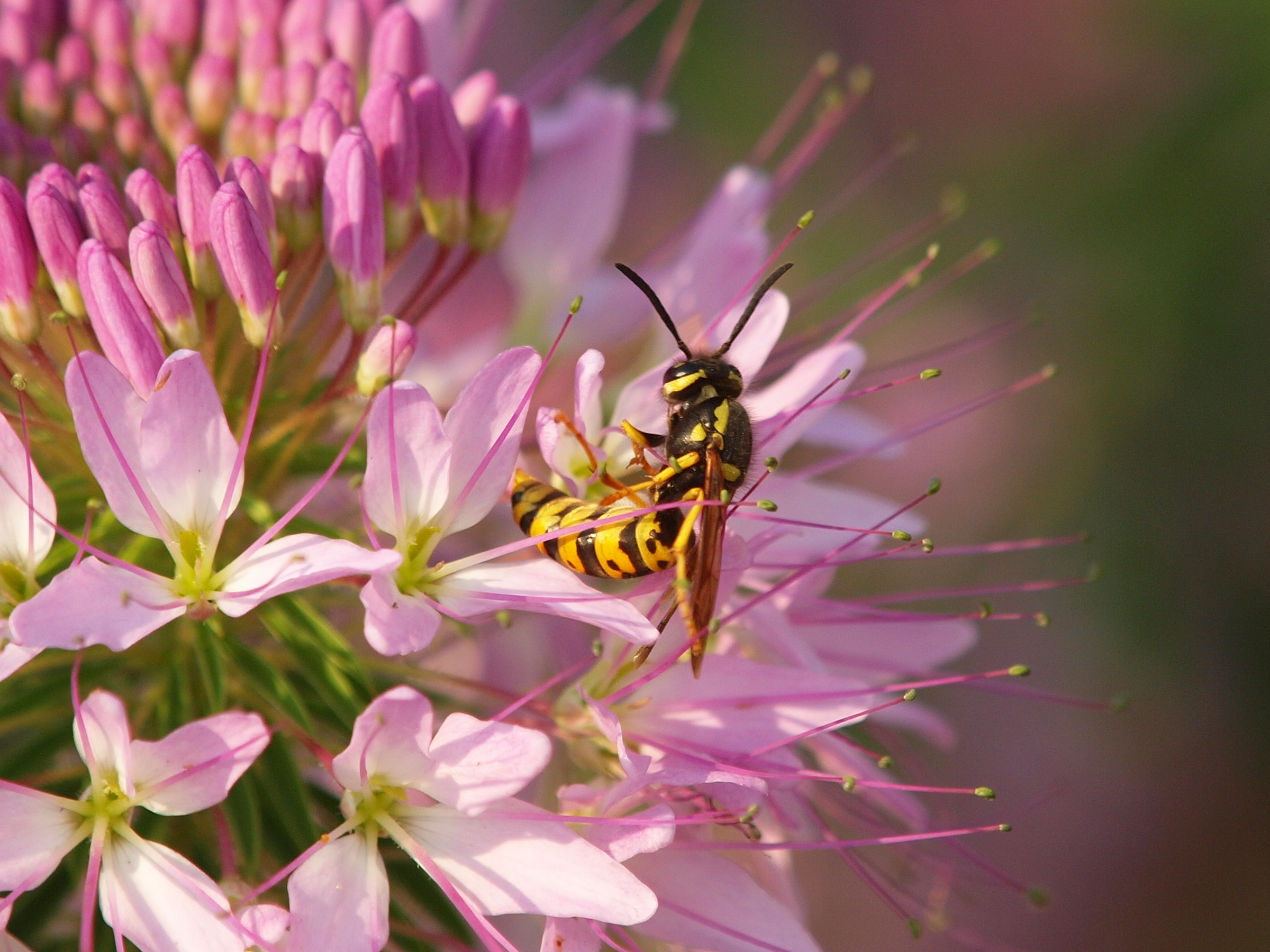
Prairie yellowjacket pollinating a flower

== Behavior ==
=== Worker behaviors ===
Vespula atropilosa only forage for live prey and are not scavengers like other wasps. When in screenhouses, workers will also forage for vegetation growing in the screenhouse. Workers in screenhouses often steal captured prey from each other even when there is no shortage of prey. Theft occurs while workers cut up prey before taking it back to the nest. After prey has been caught, workers fly off quickly so they can malaxate the prey. This behavior might be adaptive since it takes successful workers away from the site of capture and avoids further contact with other workers. Prey theft occurs when V. atropilosa are confined in screenhouses but not when they are foraging in their natural habitat.

=== Mating behavior ===
Mating usually occurs during mid-day and is initiated while the queen is in flight. Several males will chase a queen and attempt to mate with her. One or two of the males will knock the queen to the ground where most matings occur. It is typical for copulations to only last a minute on average due to frequent interruptions by competing males. One queen was observed in a period of 10 minutes to mate 4 times with many males, each copulation lasting only about one minute. In order to maintain close contact during mating, males grasp tightly to the queen's thorax. The queen may possess a sexual attractant since males will follow a queen flying into a screenhouse and groups of males frequently surround queens.

== Kin selection and altruism ==
V. atropilosa is a social wasp. Social wasps live in altruistic colonies consisting of one queen and her many offspring who are workers (daughters) or reproductives (sons). Wasps have haplodiploidy sex determination, meaning that females emerge from fertilized eggs (diploid) while males emerge from unfertilized eggs (haploid). This system of sex determination results in daughters from a single father being more related to each other than to their mother. This is because each worker receives all of her father's genes (he is haploid and only has only one set to give) but only half of her mother's genes. Thus, each worker is 75% related to her sisters but only 50% related to the queen. Since workers are so closely related to their sisters, there is a genetic incentive to practice kin altruism. They are ensuring the maximum chances of the survival of their genes by ensuring the welfare of the colony.

== Interaction with other species ==
=== Diet ===
Workers catch a wide range of prey, most commonly insects of the orders Hemiptera mainly of the suborder homoptera (for example aphids, cicadas, and leafhoppers), Lepidoptera (moths and butterflies), and Diptera (flies). Vespula atropilosa will prey on any insect of the correct size that lacks chemical or behavioral defense mechanisms. The best prey include Hemiptera, adult lacewings, and spiders. Like Vespula pensylvanica, V. atropilosa primarily preys on adult Diptera, Homoptera, Lepidoptera larvae, and grasshoppers.

=== Vespula pensylvanica ===
Vespula pensylvanica is another species of yellowjacket that is also a member of the genus Vespula. It overlaps with Vespula atropilosa in its distribution. Both wasps are commonly found in Pullman, Washington where their behavior has been studied comparatively. V. pensylvanica differs in its foraging behavior. It is both a predator and a scavenger, capturing not only live insects but also scavenging for dead insects, birds, fish, road kill, human garbage etc. The two species also differ somewhat in terms of mating behavior. V. pensylvanica queens remain stationary while mating. The queen mates with one male for a longer duration than V. atropilosa, ranging from 2 to 11 minutes in duration.

== Nest exploiters ==
=== Cryptophagus pilosus ===
Adult Cryptophagus pilosus, a species of beetle, has been found in some Vespula atropilosa nests. In autumn they were present in small numbers of about 1 to 8 per nest. Larvae of C. pilosus were not found in nests in the field but were produced in large numbers in V. atropilosa colonies that were transplanted into screenhouses. Infestations of C. pilosus occurs late in the colony cycle typically after nest deterioration has begun.

=== Fannia ===
Fannia is a genus consisting of flies. Fannia eggs or larvae were found in some V. atropilosa colonies. Small numbers of larvae of both Fannia canicularis commonly known as the lesser house fly and Fannia pusio commonly known as the chicken dung fly were found in cavities in yellowjacket nests of both V. atropilosa and V. pensylvanica. Fannia infestations take place late in the season during colony decline. Fannia larvae are found at the bottom of nest cavities and it is believed that these flies may be coprophagous.

=== Dendrophaonia querceti ===
Dendrophaonia querceti are a member of the Muscidae family of flies. Their larvae have been found in soil deposits below the nests of some prairie yellowjackets. While most D. querceti are found in soil below the nest, some can be found inside the envelope of a nest. Most nest cavities contain 20-50 mature D. querceti larvae. Mature D. querceti larvae can be found later in the season in October and November. D. querceti larvae scavenged on yellowjacket excrement, dead brood, and dead adults found underneath nests and at the bottoms of nest cavities.

== Human importance ==
Prairie yellowjackets are not usually pests. Colonies are often found in dry yards of people residing in the Pacific Northwest but workers do not usually pose a threat to humans unless the colony is disturbed. Since prairie yellowjackets are predators of other insects, they have the benefit of getting rid of local pests such as lacebugs and caterpillars.

=== Venom ===
V. atropilosa has small Dufour's glands (responsible for secreting venom) compared to Vespula infernalis, which has large venom reservoirs and large Dufour's glands. Venom from these two species, as well as that of V. pensylvanica, do not vary in their degree of lethalness to workers. Queens carry more venom than workers. An average worker can kill at least 15 other workers, but killing a queen is much harder and requires use of about 1/3 of a worker's total venom supply. While venom may occasionally be used in intraspecies conflicts, it is more frequently used to defend the colony against macropredators and predators encountered during foraging, including humans.

== Trapping prairie yellowjackets ==
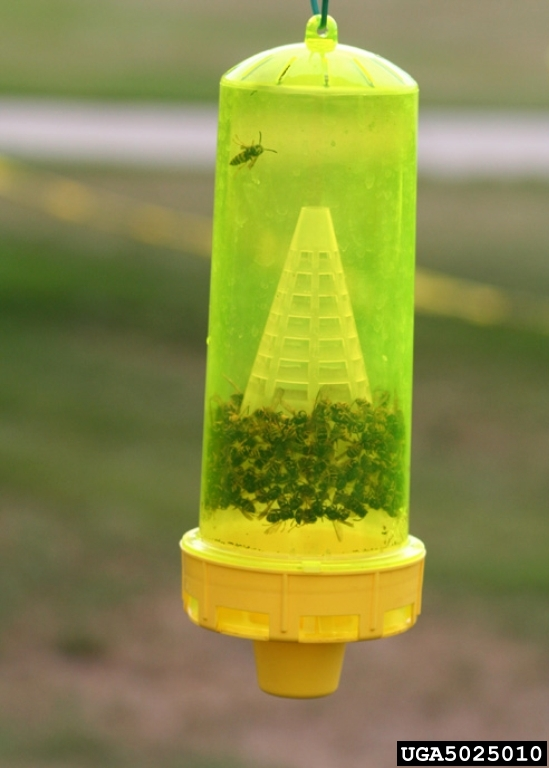
Heptyl butyrate trap containing both prairie yellowjackets and western yellowjackets

Prairie yellowjackets respond well to both heptyl butyrate and meat baits, but fruit baits can also be used as trap lures. There are several commercial designs of yellowjacket traps but most are baited with heptyl butyrate. Heptyl butyrate is highly attractive to both Vespula atropilosa and Vespula pensylvanica (commonly known as the western yellowjacket). These traps can catch and hold a large number of yellowjackets but their effectiveness in reducing yellowjacket populations is questionable.

Another kind of trap is a water trap. Water traps use fresh meat as bait. In these traps, the meat is suspended with string above a pan of water. A bit of detergent is added to the water to break the surface tension. Yellowjackets coming to retrieve the bait will usually fall into the water after consuming the food and will drown.

The most effective traps should be set up early so that queens coming out of hibernation can be captured before they are able to initiate colonies. Early trappings can also catch the oldest workers who are vital in supplying the new colony and nursing the young workers.
