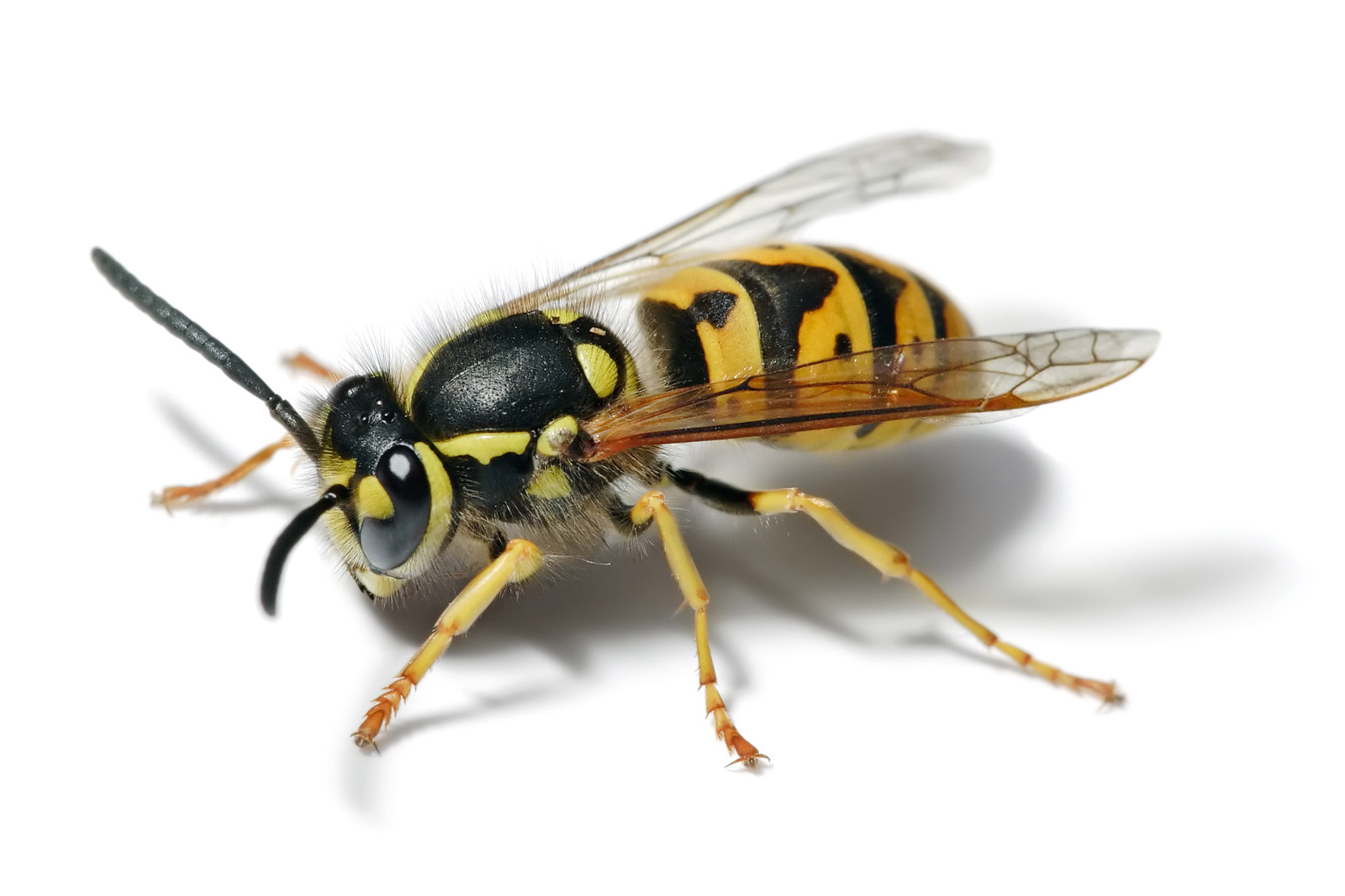
- Vespula germanica

Scientific classification
- Kingdom: Animalia
- Phylum: Arthropoda
- Clade: Pancrustacea
- Class: Insecta
- Order: Hymenoptera
- Family: Vespidae
- Subfamily: Vespinae

Genera known as yellowjackets
- Dolichovespula; Vespula

= Yellowjacket =

American name for two genera of wasps

Yellowjacket (yellow jacket) is the common name in North America for predatory social wasps of the genera Vespula and Dolichovespula. Members of these genera are known simply as "wasps" in other English-speaking countries. Most of these are black and yellow like the eastern yellowjacket (Vespula maculifrons) and the aerial yellowjacket (Dolichovespula arenaria); some are black and white like the bald-faced hornet (Dolichovespula maculata). Some have an abdomen with a red background color instead of black. They can be identified by their distinctive markings, their occurrence only in colonies, and a characteristic, rapid, side-to-side flight pattern prior to landing. All females are capable of stinging. Yellowjackets are important predators of pest insects.

== Identification ==
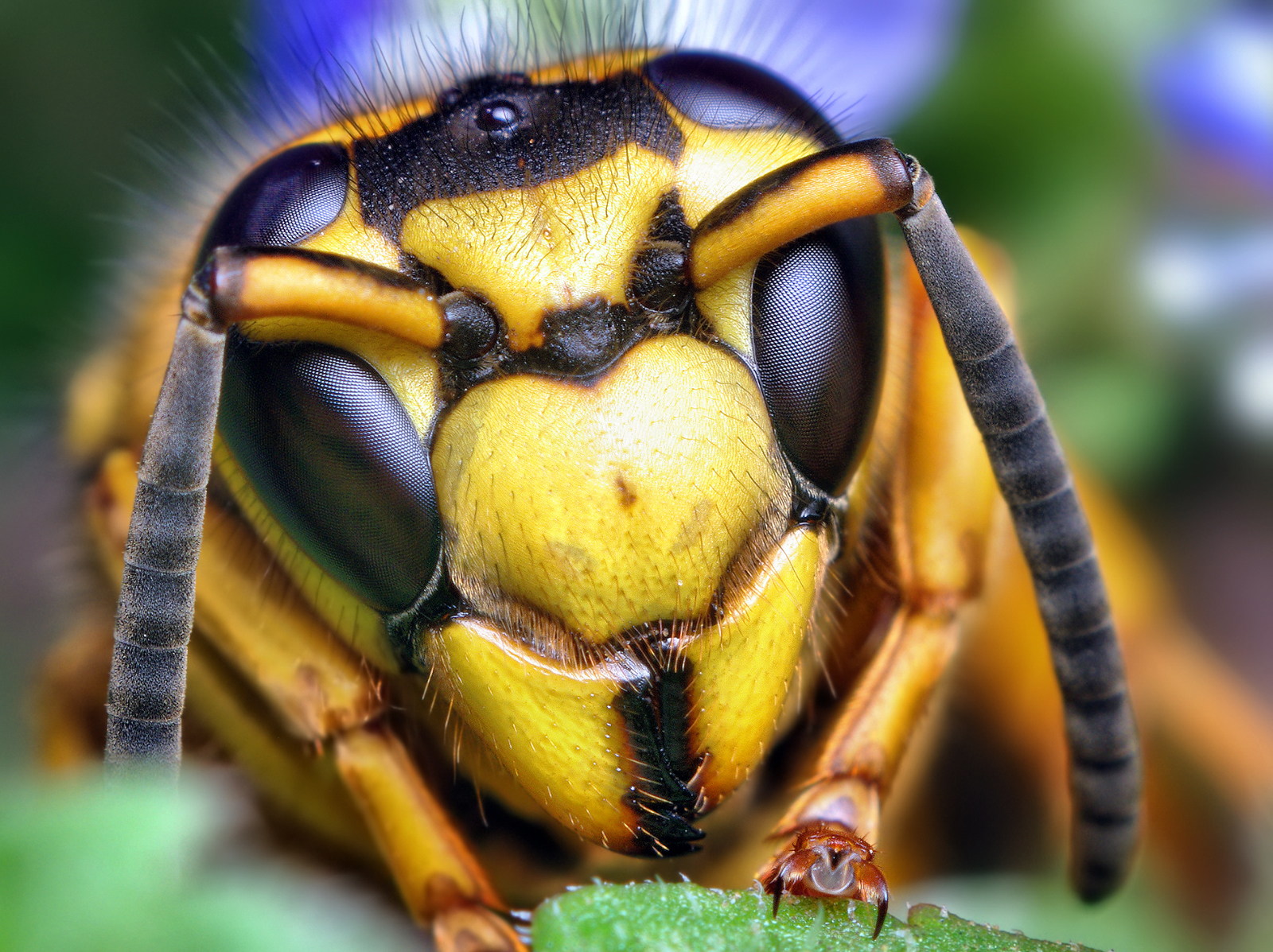
Face of a southern yellowjacket (Vespula squamosa)

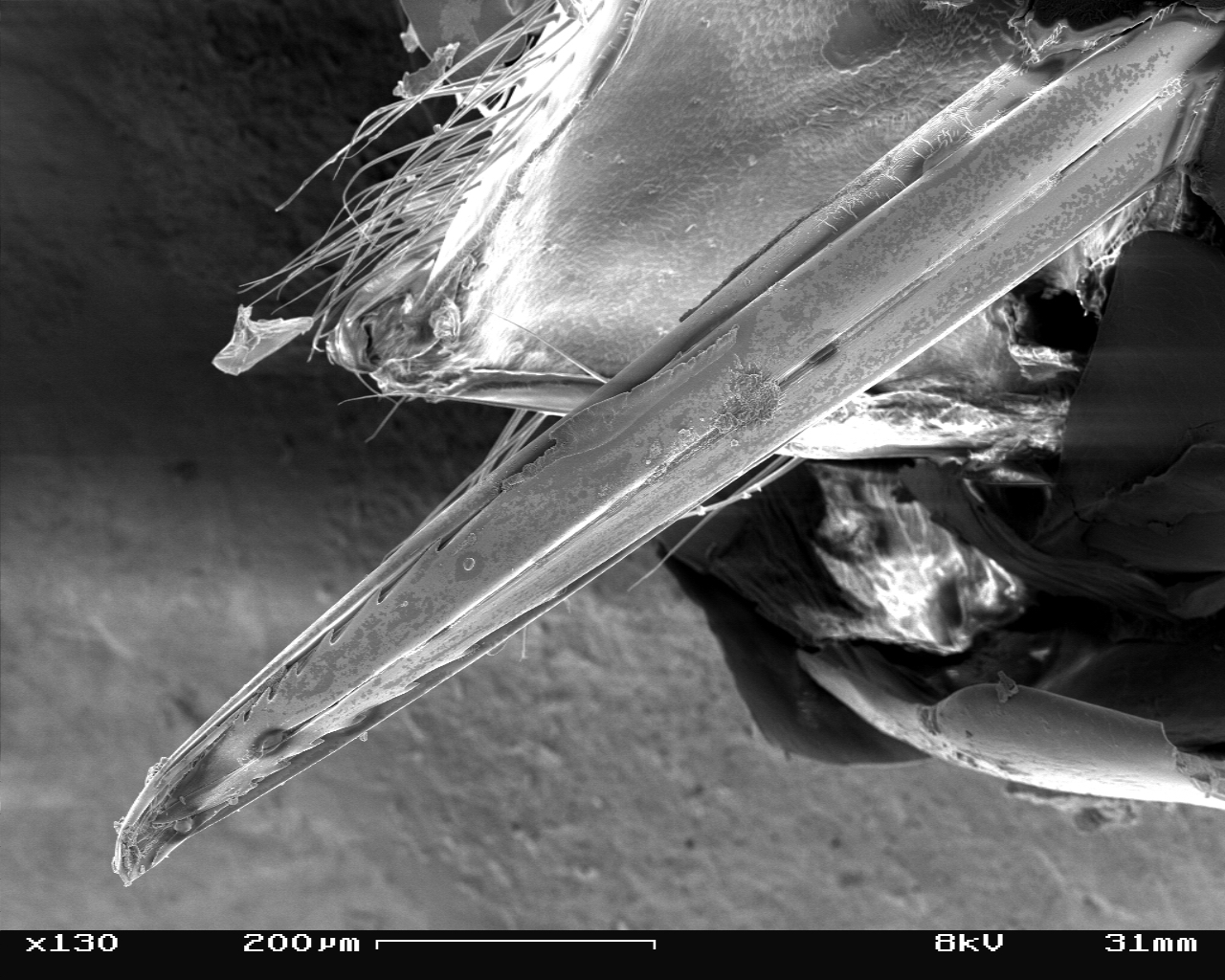
Yellowjacket stinger in its sheath in a scanning electron microscope

Yellowjackets may be confused with other wasps, such as hornets and paper wasps such as Polistes dominula. A typical yellowjacket worker is about 12 mm (0.47 in) long, with alternating bands on the abdomen; the queen is larger, about 19 mm (0.75 in) long (the different patterns on their abdomens help separate various species).

Yellowjackets are sometimes mistakenly called "bees" (as in "meat bees"), given that they are similar in size and general coloration to honey bees. In contrast to honey bees, yellowjackets have yellow or white markings, are not covered with dense tan-brown hair on their bodies, and do not have the flattened, hairy pollen-carrying hind legs characteristic of honey bees (although they are capable of pollination).

Yellowjackets have lance-like stingers with small barbs, and typically sting repeatedly, though occasionally a stinger becomes lodged and pulls free of the wasp's body; the venom, like most bee and wasp venoms, is primarily dangerous to only those humans who are allergic or are stung many times. All species have yellow or white on their faces. Their mouthparts are well developed with strong mandibles for capturing and chewing insects, with probosces for sucking nectar, fruit, and other juices. Yellowjackets build nests in trees, shrubs, or in protected places such as inside man-made structures, or in soil cavities, tree stumps, mouse burrows, etc. They build them from wood fiber they chew into a paper-like pulp. Many other insects exhibit protective mimicry of aggressive, stinging yellowjackets; in addition to numerous bees and wasps (Müllerian mimicry), the list includes some flies, moths, and beetles (Batesian mimicry).

Yellowjackets' closest relatives, the hornets, closely resemble them but have larger heads, seen especially in the large distance from the eyes to the back of the head.

== Life cycle and habits ==
Yellowjackets are social hunters living in colonies containing workers, queens, and males (drones). Colonies are annual with only inseminated queens overwintering. Fertilized queens are found in protected places such as in hollow logs, stumps, under bark, leaf litter, soil cavities, and man-made structures. Queens emerge during the warm days of late spring or early summer, select a nest site, and build a small paper nest in which they lay eggs. After eggs hatch from the 30 to 50 brood cells, the queen feeds the young larvae for about 18 to 20 days. Larvae pupate, then emerge later as small, infertile females called workers. Workers in the colony take over caring for the larvae, feeding them with chewed-up meat or fruit. By midsummer, the first adult workers emerge and assume the tasks of nest expansion, foraging for food, care of the queen and larvae, and colony defense.

From this time until her death in the autumn, the queen remains inside the nest, laying eggs. The colony then expands rapidly, reaching a maximum size of 4,000–5,000 workers and a nest of 10,000–15,000 cells in late summer. The species V. squamosa, in the southern part of its range, may build much larger perennial colonies populated by dozens of queens, tens of thousands of workers, and hundreds of thousands of cells. At peak size, reproductive cells are built with new males and queens produced. Adult reproductives remain in the nest fed by the workers. New queens build up fat reserves to overwinter. Adult reproductives leave the parent colony to mate. Males die quickly after mating, while fertilized queens seek protected places to overwinter. Parent colony workers dwindle, usually leaving the nest to die, as does the founding queen. Abandoned nests rapidly decompose and disintegrate during the winter. They can persist as long as they are kept dry, but are rarely used again. In the spring, the cycle is repeated; weather in the spring is the most important factor in colony establishment.

The adult yellowjacket diet consists primarily of sugars and carbohydrates, such as fruits, flower nectar, and tree sap. Larvae feed on proteins derived from insects, meats, and fish. Workers collect, chew, and condition such foods before feeding them to the larvae. Many of the insects collected by the workers are considered pest species, making the yellowjacket beneficial to agriculture. Larvae, in return, secrete a sugary substance for workers to eat; this exchange is a form of trophallaxis. As insect sources of food diminish in late summer, larvae produce less for workers to eat. Foraging workers pursue sources of sugar outside the nest including ripe fruits and human garbage.

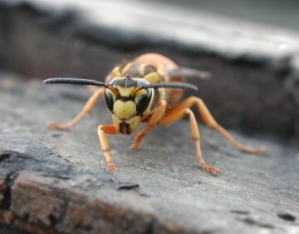
Vespula squamosa queen

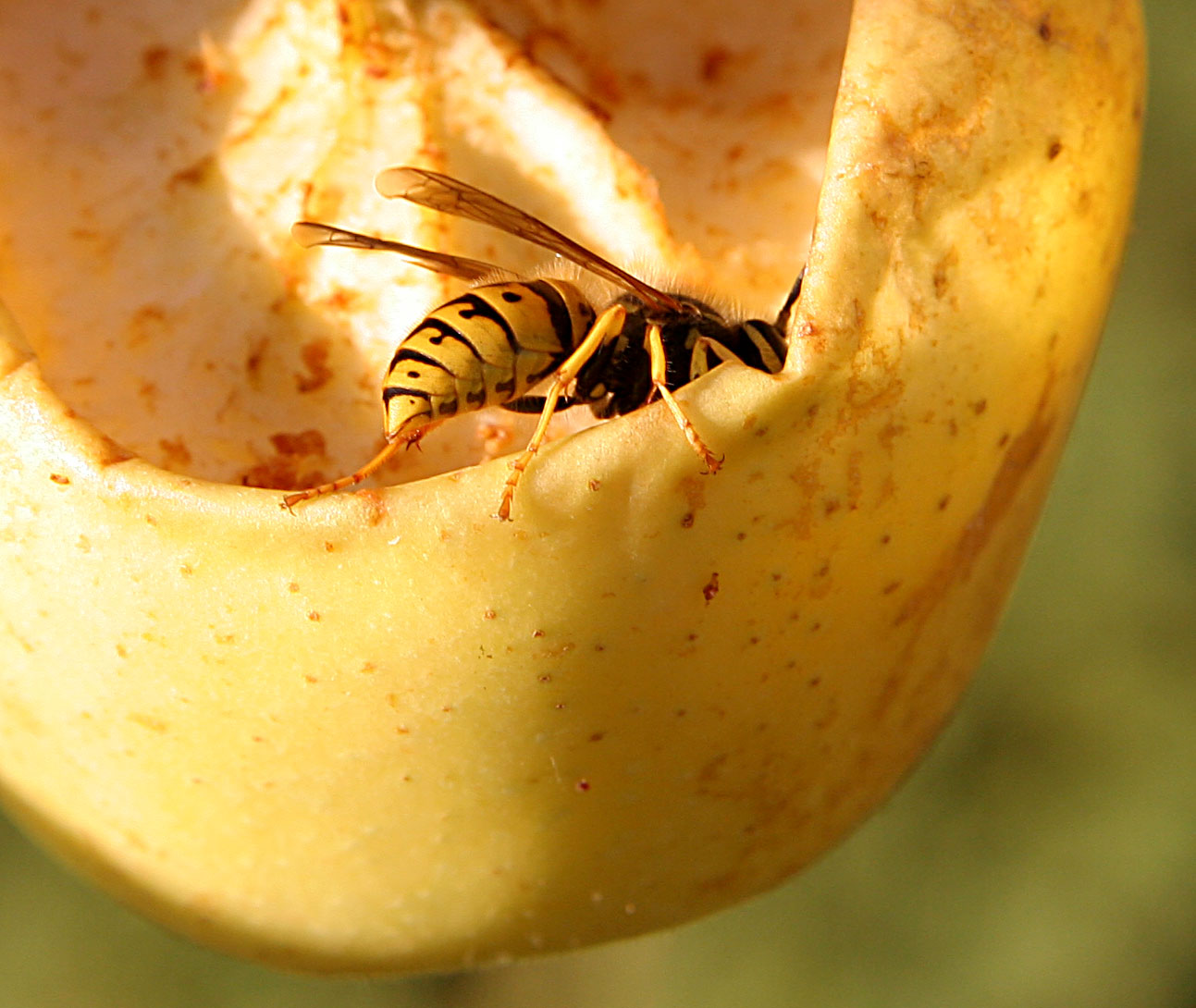
Yellowjacket eating an apple

Yellowjacket wasps can be very aggressive if disturbed. Here the ground was pounded next to their nest starting an ongoing disturbance—with sound.

Yellowjacket wasps are disturbed, but not enough to swarm around their nest entrance—with sound. The response is down to one wasp after seven minutes.

Yellow jacket wasp catches green bottle fly to feed its larvae, followed by the final catch in slow motion. Rabbit carrion is four days old.

Yellowjacket wasps using a stone as a landmark to navigate to their nest entrance. When the stone moved, they continued for a time to return orienting with the stone.

Yellowjacket response when a leaf blocks their entrance—with sound.

Very late in season, nearly every morning is too cold for the yellowjackets to forage. In another several weeks all are dead—except the new queens sheltering somewhere else.

== Notable species ==
- Two of the European yellowjacket species, the German wasp (Vespula germanica), and the common wasp (Vespula vulgaris) were originally native to Europe, but are now established as invasives in southern Africa, New Zealand, eastern Australia, and South America.
- The North American yellowjacket (Vespula alascensis), eastern yellowjacket (Vespula maculifrons), western yellowjacket (Vespula pensylvanica), and prairie yellowjacket (Vespula atropilosa) are native to North America.
- Southern yellowjacket (Vespula squamosa), a species that is sometimes free-living and sometimes a social parasite
- Bald-faced hornets (Dolichovespula maculata) belong among the yellowjackets rather than the true hornets. They are not usually called "yellowjackets" because of their ivory-on-black coloration.
- Aerial yellowjacket (Dolichovespula arenaria)
- Tree wasp (Dolichovespula sylvestris)

== Nest ==
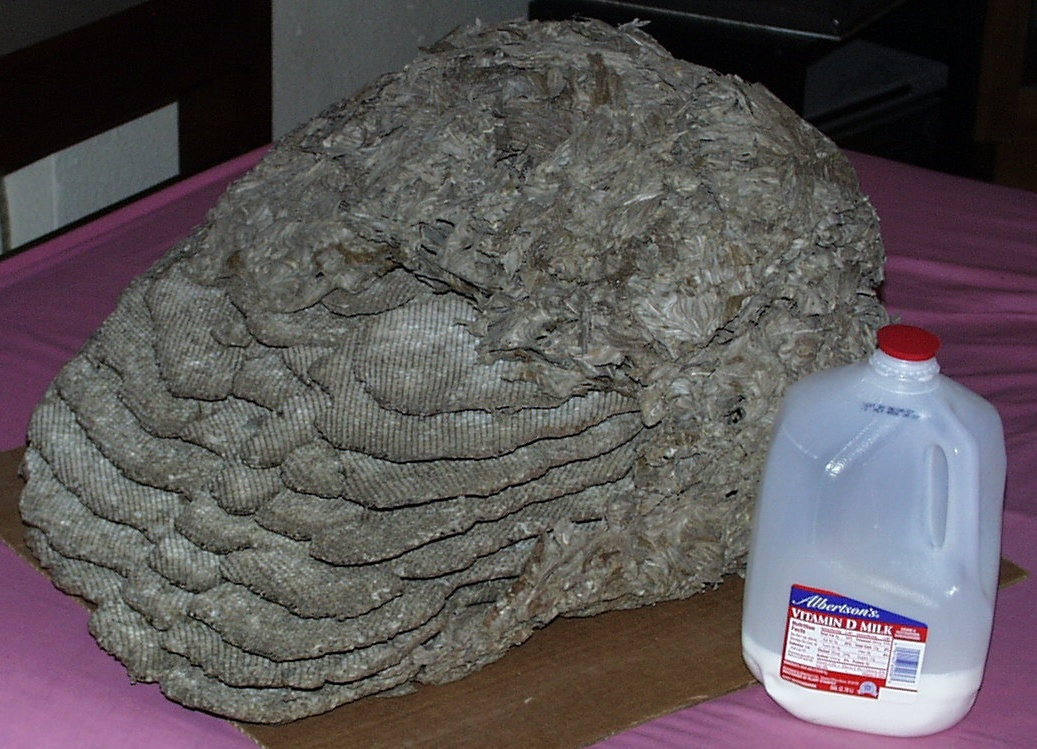
Two-year yellowjacket nest, with a one US gallon (3.8-liter) container for size reference. Collected in Alabama, US, 2007. Dimensions approximately 18 inches by 24 inches by 12 inches (46 cm by 61 cm by 30 cm).

Dolichovespula species such as the aerial yellowjacket, D. arenaria, and the bald-faced hornet, tend to create exposed aerial nests. This feature is shared with some true hornets, which has led to some naming confusion.

Vespula species, in contrast, build concealed nests, usually underground.

Yellowjacket nests usually last for only one season, dying off in winter. The nest is started by a single queen, called the "foundress". Typically, a nest can reach the size of a basketball by the end of a season. In parts of Australia, New Zealand, the Pacific Islands, and southern coastal areas of the United States, the winters are mild enough to allow nest overwintering. Nests that survive multiple seasons become massive and often possess multiple egg-laying queens.

== In the United States ==
Yellowjacket wasp at fermenting fruit harassed to leave by aggressive ant

The German yellowjacket (V. germanica) first appeared in Ohio in 1975, and has now become the dominant species over the eastern yellowjacket. It is bold and aggressive and can sting repeatedly and painfully. It will mark aggressors and pursue them. It is often confused with Polistes dominula, another invasive species in the United States, due to their very similar pattern. The German yellowjacket builds its nests in cavities—not necessarily underground—with the peak worker population in temperate areas between 1000 and 3000 individuals between May and August. Each colony produces several thousand new reproductives after this point through November.

The eastern yellowjacket builds its nests underground, also with the peak worker population between 1000 and 3000 individuals, similar to the German yellowjacket. Nests are built entirely of wood fiber and are completely enclosed except for a small entrance at the bottom. The color of the paper is highly dependent on the source of the wood fibers used. The nests contain multiple, horizontal tiers of combs within. Larvae hang within the combs.

In the southeastern United States, where southern yellowjacket (Vespula squamosa) nests may persist through the winter, colony sizes of this species may reach 100,000 adult wasps. The same kind of nest expansion has occurred in Hawaii with the invasive western yellowjacket (V. pensylvanica).
