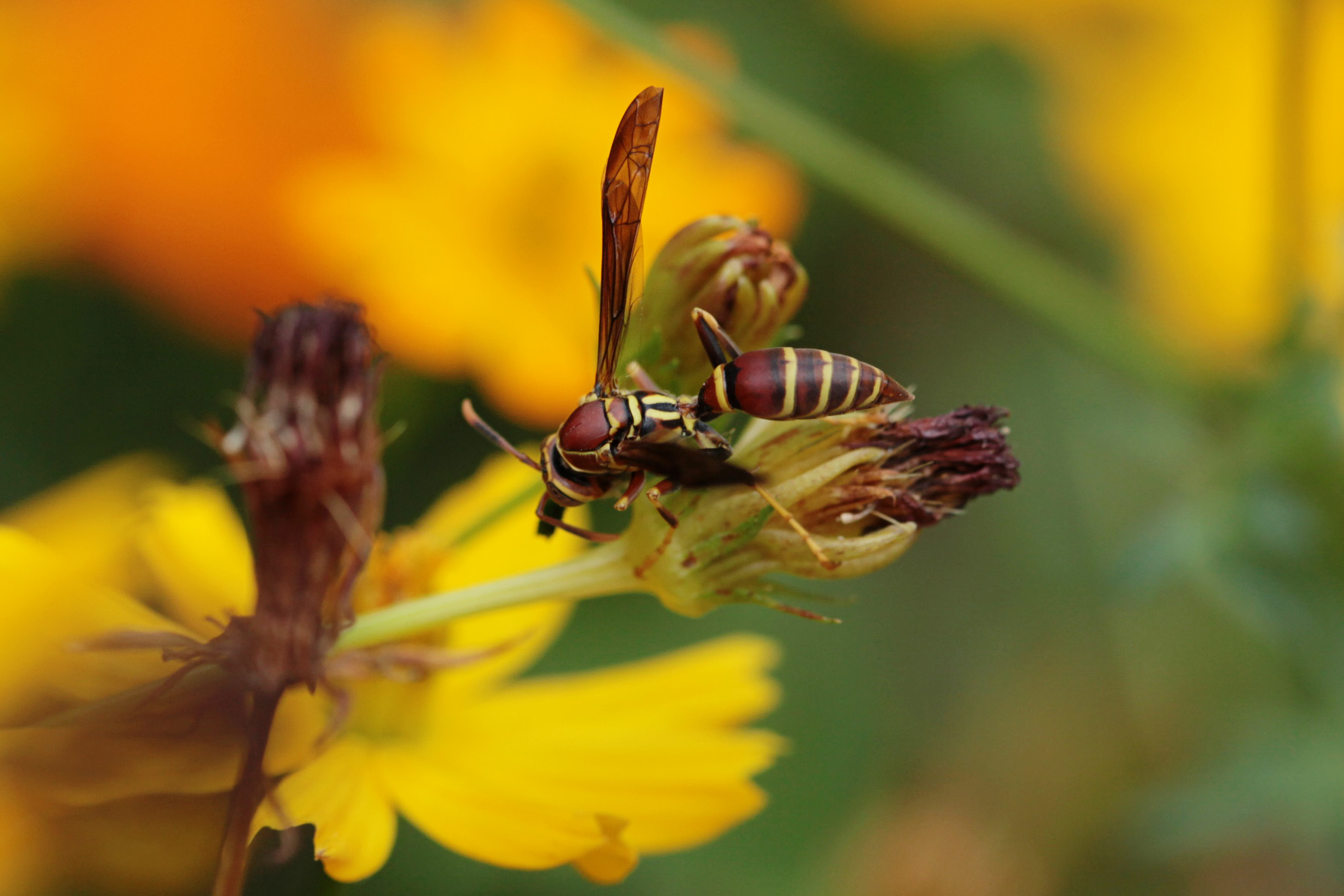

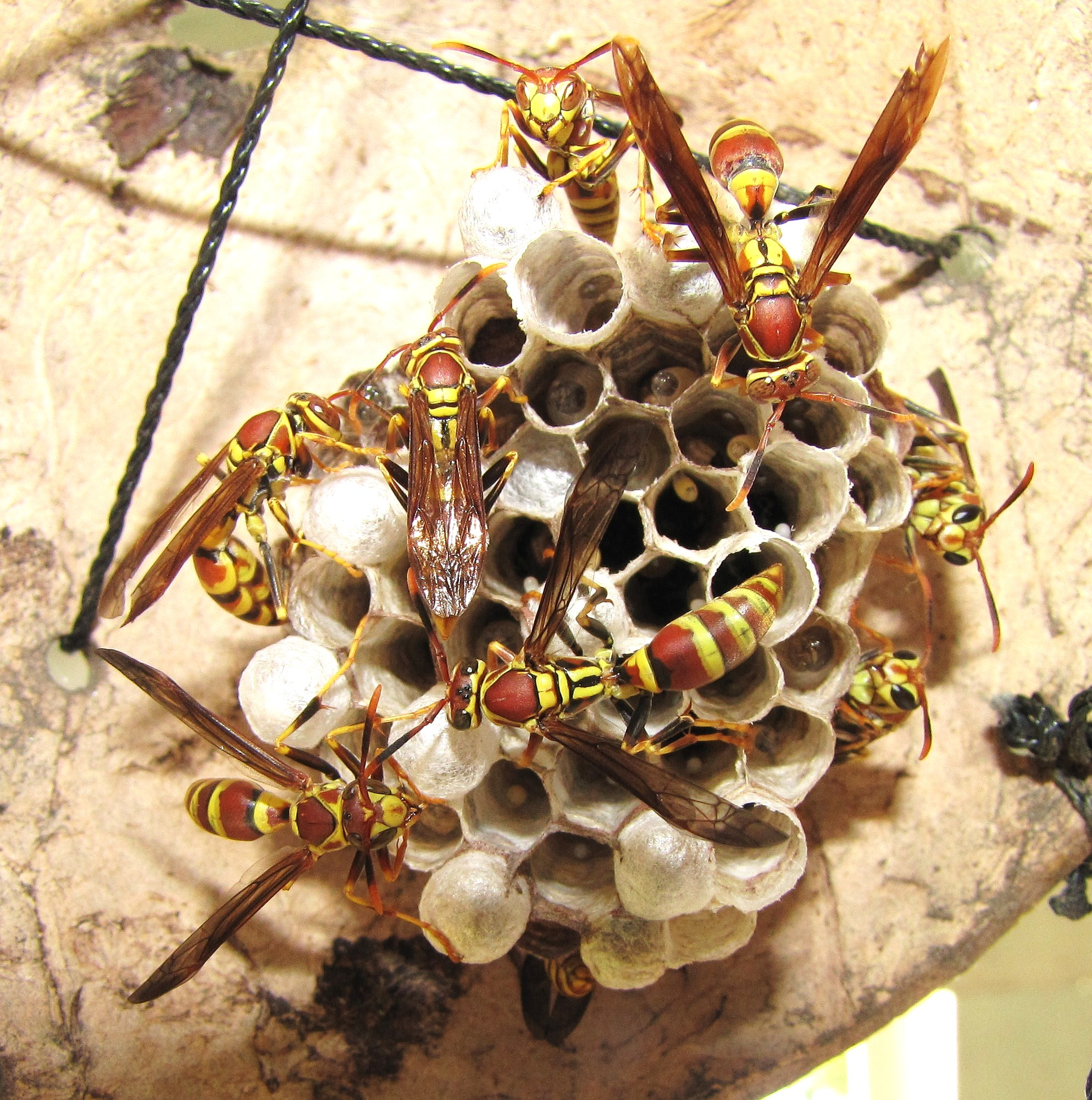

Scientific classification
- Kingdom: Animalia
- Phylum: Arthropoda
- Clade: Pancrustacea
- Class: Insecta
- Order: Hymenoptera
- Family: Vespidae
- Subfamily: Polistinae
- Tribe: Polistini
- Genus: Polistes
- Species: P. exclamans

Binomial name
- Polistes exclamans Viereck, 1906

Synonyms
- Polistes instabilis coahuilae Richards, 1978; Polistes exclamans durangoensis Snelling, 1955

= Polistes exclamans =

Species of wasp

Polistes exclamans, the Guinea paper wasp, is a social wasp and is part of the family Vespidae of the order Hymenoptera. It has been found in Ontario, Canada and the eastern United States from Illinois down south to Florida and west to Nebraska and California. It is also found in Mexico from Chihuahua to Jalisco, Hidalgo. P. exclamans has shown variability in its range including an absence of the species in eastern Missouri from the 1920’s to 1940’s, a presence in the 1960’s to 1980’s, and an apparent absence again of the species in these same sites in eastern Missouri since 1989. This suggests that their range has either expanded northward and contracted southward or that they have large, long-term cycles of abundance. P. exclamans has three specific castes, including males, workers, and queens, but the dominance hierarchy is further distinguished by age. The older the wasp is, the higher it is in ranking within the colony. In most P. exclamans nests, there is one queen who lays all the eggs in the colony. The physiological similarities between the worker and queen castes have led to experiments attempting to distinguish the characteristics of these two castes and how they are determined, though males have easily identifiable physiological characteristics. Since P. exclamans live in relatively small, open combed nests, they are often subject to predators and parasites, such as Chalcoela iphitalis, Elasmus polistis, and birds. P. exclamans have defense and recognition strategies that help protect against these predators and parasites.

== Taxonomy and phylogeny ==
Polistes exclamans is part of subfamily Polistinae within the hymenopteran family Vespidae. Polistinae (paper wasps) is the second largest of six vespid subfamilies, containing around 950 species, and is composed entirely of social wasps. It is made up of four tribes; P. exclamans is part of tribe Polistini. Genus Polistes is currently split into four subgenera that are distributed across the world; P. exclamans is a part of the New World subgenus Aphanilopterus and is most closely related to P. annularis, P. buysonni, P. canadensis, P. lanio, P. cavapyta, P. simillimus, P. crinitus, P. versicolor, and P. instabilis.

== Description and identification ==
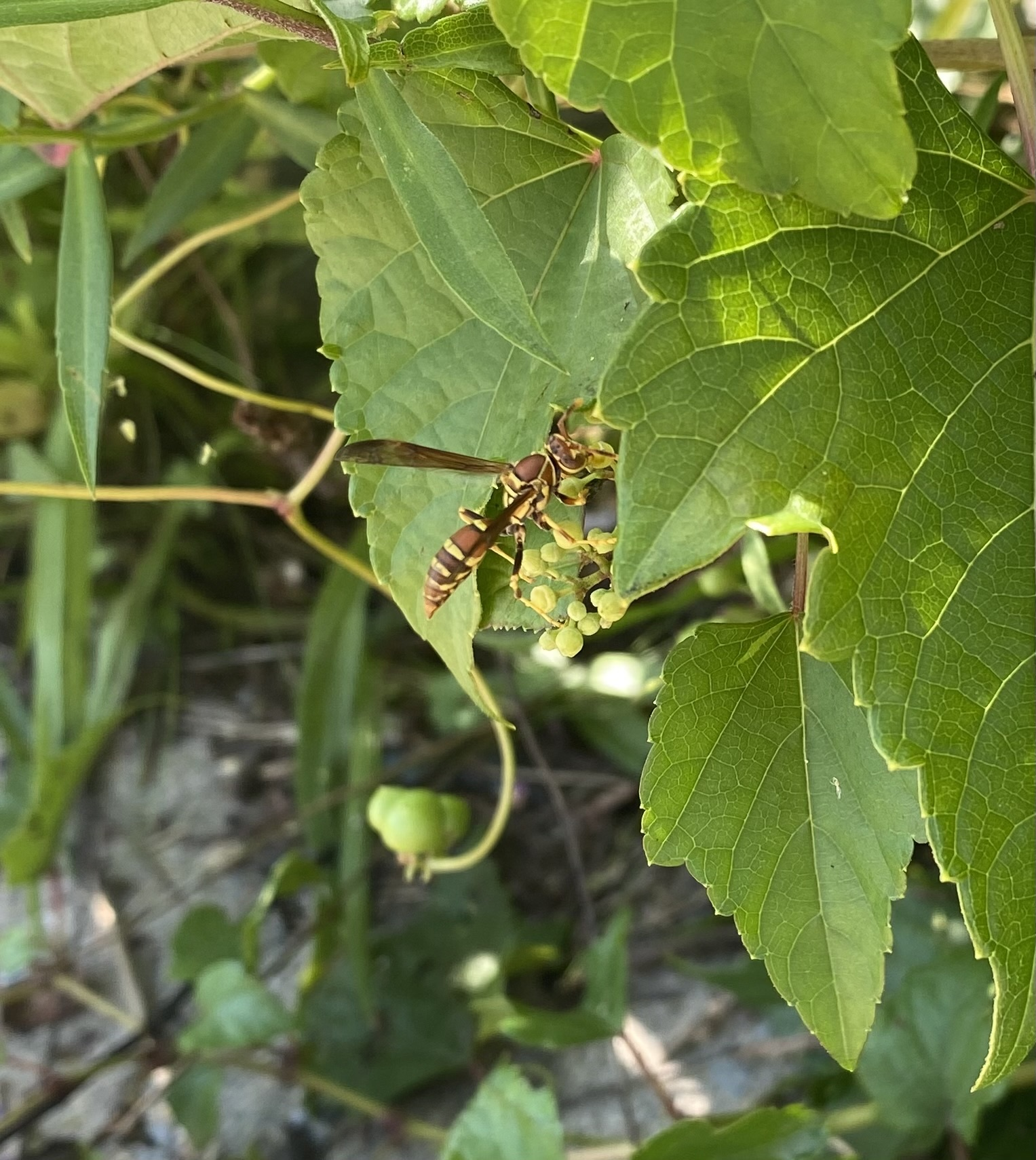
P. exclamans in New York

There are two forms of Polistes exclamans in the United States: typical and variable. The typical form is found in the south-eastern United States and inhabits the following states: North Carolina, South Carolina, Georgia, Alabama, Florida, Texas, Louisiana, Oklahoma, Arkansas, Kansas, Colorado, and Arizona. Although this form's color can vary, it almost always has some yellow coloring. Both the propodeum and the mesonotum are marked with yellow. The propodeum normally has four yellow stripes, whereas the mesonotum has yellow lines. It also may have yellow markings on its head. The wings, however, are not yellow in color or yellow tinged like some other wasps but are infuscate and purple in color. The typical form often can be confused with Polistes fuscatus, Polistes crinitus, or Polistes minor. The variable form is red-brown in coloring. The middle of the flagellum, the base of the abdominal segments, and the outer side of the mid and hind tibiae are infuscate or black colored, as are the wings. Instead of yellow markings, the variable form has pale ivory-white markings that are dispersed throughout the body. P. exclamans have antennae banded with red, black and yellow, while most paper wasps only have one antennae color. In females, the fore wing length can range from 13.0 to 16.5 mm (0.51–0.65 in) and in males the fore wings can range from 12.0 to 15.0 mm (0.47–0.59 in). The extent of ferruginous (rust-colored) markings is variable.

Although no distinguishing structural features have been found to separate the workers and queens, the male is easily identified by its bulging eyes, subquadrate clypeus, and slender antennae. P. exclamans males are also more variable in external morphology compared to females. This is possible given the male's hemizygosity (females are homozygous).

== Distribution and habitat ==
Polistes exclamans is distributed throughout the United States in the following areas and states: New Jersey down to Florida, Florida to Texas, and west to Nebraska, Colorado, Arizona, and California. It has also been found in Mexico and the Bahamas, as well as Ontario, Canada.

As a vespid wasp, P. exclamans nests are typically made up of paper with a single layer of cells with open combs. Although nest size varies, the upper limit is around 500 cells. Although many vespid wasp nests have an outer envelope of paper, P. exclamans nests do not. As indicated by Strassmann and Orgren, “Nests are approximately circular, and have a single off-center pedicel [basal part] usually located towards the top of the nest. Cells near the pedicle are the oldest.” P. exclamans are particularly able to colonize new sites, as foundresses often disperse into new territories. P. exclamans have often been found to have nests located near man-made structures and tend to more readily build nests in and near these man-made structures. Out of six wasp species, P. exclamans was the only one that occupied artificial nesting sites. It prefers well-lit, open sites.

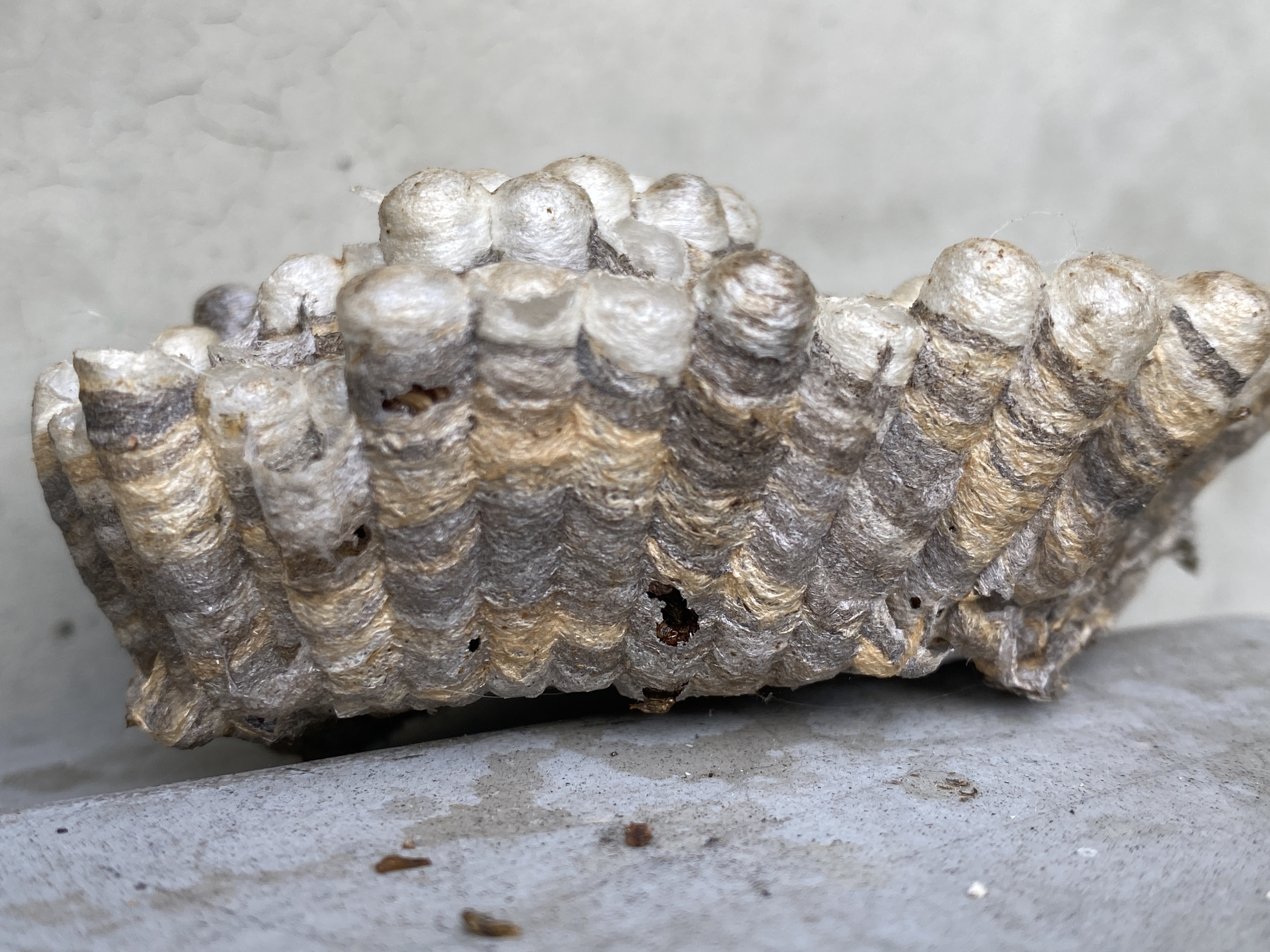
Old guinea paper wasp nest showing layers of different colors produced from different source materials

Polistes nests can be built from wood fiber which are collected from posts and plant stems. The fiber is formed into a paper-like comb with hexagonal cells. The nests are orientated downward and are held up by one filament. P. exclamans have also been observed occupying artificial nests put out by researchers and consisting of bundles of straws.

== Colony cycle ==
The colony cycle of Polistes exclamans is longer than that of northern wasp species, shorter than that of tropical wasp species, and as such is in “some respects intermediate between” the two. Their cycle occurs between March and September. The first brood of workers emerges between May and July. It takes about nine to fourteen days for eggs to develop, though eggs in smaller nests and that are laid later in the season take much longer to develop, about thirteen to eighteen days for larvae to develop, about thirteen days for pupae to develop, and about a total of six to eight weeks for an egg to develop into an adult. Reproductive wasps emerge later in August or September.

== Queen ==
=== Queen characteristics ===
Polistes exclamans lives in a hierarchical society with one queen that lays the eggs. However, all of the females have the same morphology and they all have the physiological capability of taking over the egg laying if necessary (e.g., due to queen death or queen migration). Since the queen has the same morphology as the rest of the workers in the colony, this raises the question as to how the queen role is assigned and what makes her special. Studies have found that queens and males have higher levels of glucose, fructose and trehalose than workers, leading to higher cryoprotectant levels. P. exclamans use these sugars as cryoprotectant, which work by increasing the solute concentration in cells. This results in a greater survivability in colder weather. It was found that queens have a 76% survival rate in 5 °C (41 °F) weather compared to 17% survival of the workers over a 15-day test period. The queens also have a 0.5mm layer of fat surrounding their bodies. This allows them to live longer into the winter and possibly extend their mating season. The queens seem to be the only ones capable of diapause.

=== Queen development and determination ===
While there aren't many external morphological differences between queens and workers, there are some internal traits that can be signals of a wasp's social status. It has also been found that caste determination is irreversibly determined by temperature during the immature stages of development. In one experiment, some wasps emerging in June were kept in long day chambers, or chambers set at 26 °C with 16 hours of light and 8 hours of darkness. These individuals had larger and more active ovaries as compared to those who were incubated in short day chambers, which are set at 22 °C with 14 hours of light and 10 hours of darkness. It is thought that this phenomenon may occur because of a juvenile hormone secretion that determines the castes and a suppression of the workers’ ovaries by environmental or hormonal factors.

=== Gerontocracy ===
Given that Polistes exclamans nests are often destroyed or suffer through the death of the queen (most often through natural circumstances), it is necessary and adaptive for there to be a specific system for the replacement of the queen. The current system in place can best “be described as gerontocracy.” Furthermore, it is also closely related to the dominance system within the colony as well. In the dominance hierarchy, older individuals are higher in rank, whereas younger individuals serve in the lower ranks. These older female workers are generally more aggressive and forage more frequently. In reflection of this dominance ranking and the behavior of the female workers, it is seen that when a queen is no longer present in the colony, the next eldest worker becomes the new queen. This may be due to the genetics of the next eldest queen, as the replacement queen affects the overall relatedness of the females in the brood, thereby allowing the future brood to be more related to the adult workers rearing them.

=== The queen's role ===
P. exclamans tend to have smaller nests than other wasps, with typically fewer than one hundred individuals in a given nest. Because of the size of the nest, the queen tends to be the most active individual in the nest. This is because the queen has to monitor and directly control the activities of the nest. In addition to her reproductive role, the queen must also act as the pacemaker of the nest and synchronize the worker activity. However, these last two points have recently been disputed and the workers may be self organized. It has also been observed that the queen will act aggressively towards individuals that are the least active.

== Development and reproduction ==
=== Sex determination system ===
P. exclamans are haplodiploid insects, as are other Polistes species including Polistes metricus, Polistes dominula, and Polistes annularis. This means they have haploid males that produce identical haploid sperm, and diploid females that produce haploid eggs through meiosis. This has consequences for genetic relatedness within colonies, since sisters receive identical sperm if they share a father, and the normal half identical contribution from the mother. This results in sex-biased conflicts between the queen and the workers with respect to the sex ratio, with workers preferring a more female biased sex ratio, and queens preferring equal investment in queens and males.

=== Sexual investment ===
In Polistes exclamans, equal sex ratio is obtained when only 46.3% of investment is devoted to females as female wasps are 1.16 times larger than male wasps. In a study done by Strassmann, it was found that sexual investment is female biased, especially during years of high predation and when nests are generally less successful. It has been seen that in Polistes exclamans, females are produced before males. This female investment bias may result from the ability of females to become either a worker or a reproductive (this is more adaptive for the nest as it gives the nest increased flexibility compared to that of males and may be important for overall nest success) or because females provide the colony with greater nest defense. Even when the original queen is no longer present, the sexual investment is still biased towards females, which is not expected given the genetic implications of a new queen.

=== Early males ===
Workers first emerge between May and July. During this first emergence, reproductive males also emerge with this first brood and are called the "early males". These males provide a great adaptation because they allow for the presence of reproductive males. Nests with a greater number of early males produce a greater number of workers, cells, pupae, and emergences. Although it is uncertain as to why, queen deaths are common in Polistes exclamans, most frequently in May. The majority of original queens are dead by July, “well before eggs that became autumn reproductive were laid,” as reproductives emerged from late August through September. Thus, queens must remain alive post June in order to birth future reproductives, and if they are not able to do so, the eldest former worker then becomes the new queen. The reproductive early males produced may be adaptive for the deaths of the queens so that the colony will not die and will be able to continue.

=== Sexual attraction ===
As with many other insects, P. exclamans use sexual pheromones to attract members of the opposite sex. Researchers have attempted to determine the exact role that sexual pheromones play in sexual attraction in paper wasps. In one experiment, they set up a wind tunnel where males and females were exposed to a sexual pheromone wick that was isolated from males and females. These pheromones were taken by hexane extracts from whole bodies and thoraces of unmated females. The male extracts were taken from the ectal mandibular and seventh sternal glands. It was found that the opposite sex was attracted upwind of the scent and the results were intensified when a fan was turned on. The range of the scent was found to be around 2 metres.

In nature, it was observed that males would venture away from the nest in order to attract females. The males would press their gastral sterna against a perch and rub their mandible against it. This is used to attract females, and females were observed to visit these branches and sample the scents. It was also found that on some occasions, males were attracted to other male scents.

== Behavior and ecology ==
=== Presence of brood and caste differentiation ===
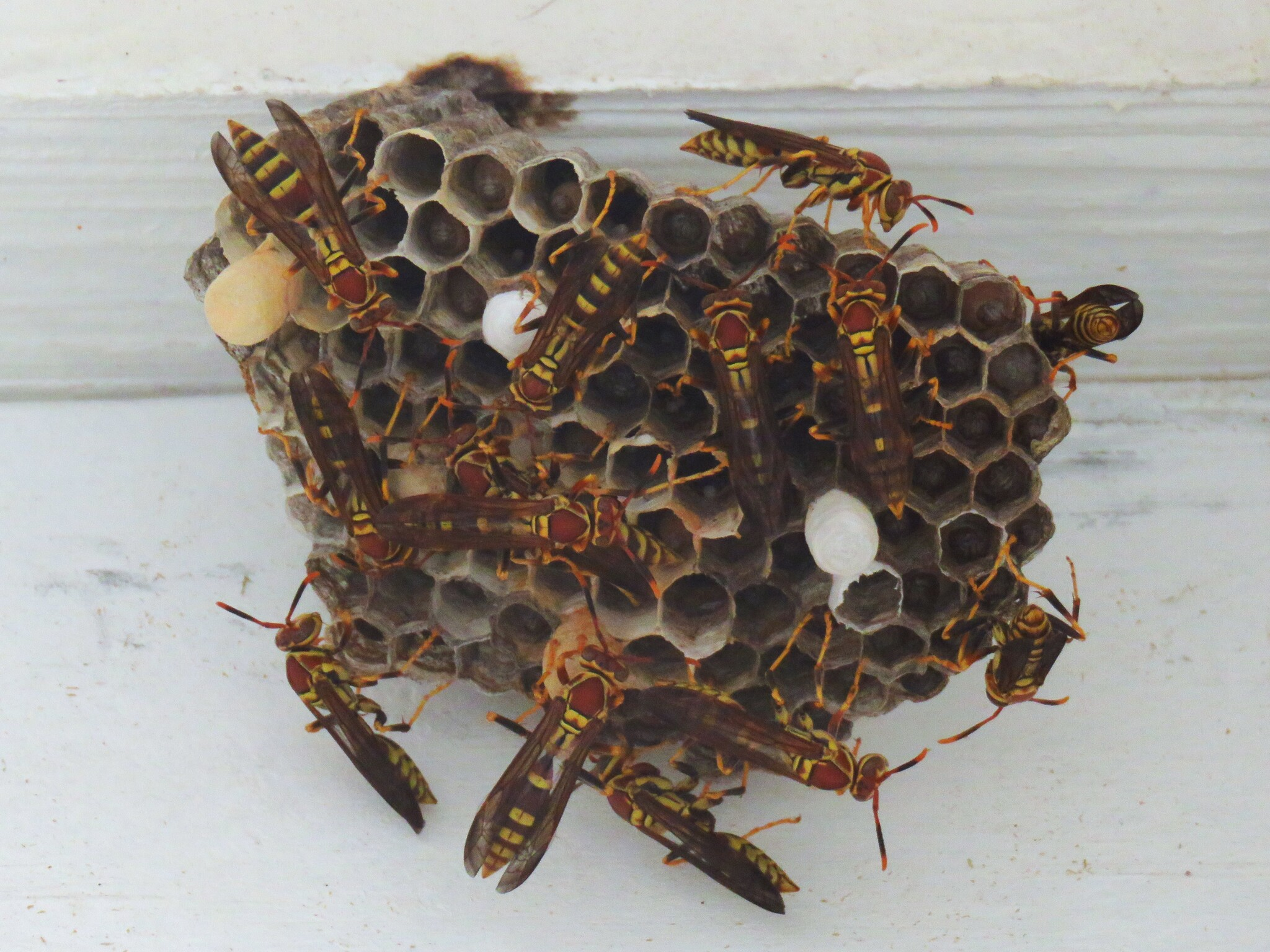
Nest

Polistes exclamans have comparably smaller nests and colonies compared to certain other eusocial wasps species. Thus, it is common for the nest to be destroyed, for the queen to die prior to the end of the season, or for the nest to fail through other means, such as predation, parasitisation, or worker mortality, leading workers to help rear broods that are less related to them than are their sister wasps. Due to this, it would be advantageous for there to be wasps that remain casteless till adulthood, allowing female wasps’ reproductive capabilities to be plastic. It has thus been predicted that P. exclamans worker wasps would act as workers if a brood were present and would begin to develop gyne characteristics if a brood was not present, exhibiting the aforementioned adaptive plasticity. Experimentally, this has been found to be true. Solis and Strassmann conducted a study in which an experimental group had the eggs and larvae removed. In the experimental group, the wasps began to behave like future queens and even developed the characteristic layer of fat common to queens. In the control group, the wasps continued to behave as workers. This is indicative that the presence of the brood affects caste differentiation and that P. exclamans female workers exhibit adaptive reproductive plasticity.

=== Relatedness recognition ===
Nest mate recognition is widespread in many eusocial insects. However, when there are no physical differences in either diet or nesting materials, many can no longer discriminate nest mate from other conspecifics. Recently, however, it has been indicated that many insects have the ability to discriminate relatives even having lived in identical environments with their non-relative counterpart. Studies have indicated that in Polistes fuscatus, former nestmates would nest in areas located close together near their natal nests the following spring. Social halictid bees also are able to recognize their relatives. In P. exclamans, it has been indicated that discrimination of relatives from non-relatives, even having lived in identical environments, is possible. This was found by Allen, Schulze Kellman, and Gamboa through an experiment in which hibernating wasps from different nests were put in a box together after being raised in identical environments. As the number of unrelated groups of wasps increased, the more clumps were formed in the box. This indicates that the wasps were capable of differentiating relative from nonrelative, an adaptive ability in the defense of their nest.

=== Hibernation ===
Many Polistes species aggregate over winter. P. exclamans clump in rather large aggregations while hibernating. “These aggregations are frequently found in protected places called hibernacula that can be as varied as crevices and cracks of rocks or trunks, beneath the bark of trees, between walls of buildings, or any other natural or artificial structures that provides protection during hibernation.” Although P. exclamans have been found in organ-pipe muddauber nests, a mud nest that can provide a certain level of protection, it is not thought to actually house hibernating P. exclamans over the winter.

=== Worker mortality ===
A typical P. exclamans worker will live somewhere between 14 and 16 days. The oldest wasp to be observed in a natural colony was 102 days old. Queens typically live 6 times longer than the workers. There has been some variation observed with the life expectancy of P. exclamans. This has typically been attributed to the colony of origin. It also must be noted that while there is variation between colonies, there typically is less variation between the original nest and the satellite nest. Variation inside a single colony may also occur because of the presence of different castes. Foragers, those who frequently travel outside the nest, lead a riskier life and tend to have lower life expectancy than those who stay in the nest. Still, it was observed that colonies with high foraging rates also had higher reproductive rates to compensate for the lower life expectancy. Another aspect, observed in one nest, was that an increase in female population led to lower longevity. This was because the females were more focused on competing to become the next queen than foraging and fulfilling their roles.

Worker death is an important factor in colony failure, and is the cause of 13–76% of colony failures. This may be in part due to the small colony size. Because the colonies are small, worker longevity is crucial for the survival of the nest.

=== Range extension ===
Throughout the 1950s and 1960s, P. exclamans was extending its range, spreading into the midwestern United States. Between 1958 and 1967 the following states had new state records of P. exclamans: Illinois, Indiana, Kentucky, Maryland, Missouri, New Jersey, New Mexico, Tennessee, and Virginia. The behavioral basis behind range expansion could be based upon the exceptional capability P. exclamans has in the colonization of new sites and the solitary nest founding behavior P. exclamans exhibits. This capability could be assisted by the “associated tendencies of P. exclamans foundresses to disperse and to move into newly available nesting sites.” Meanwhile, species with social foundresses reproduce near the place of origin and, therefore, do not extend their range as far.

=== Satellite nests ===
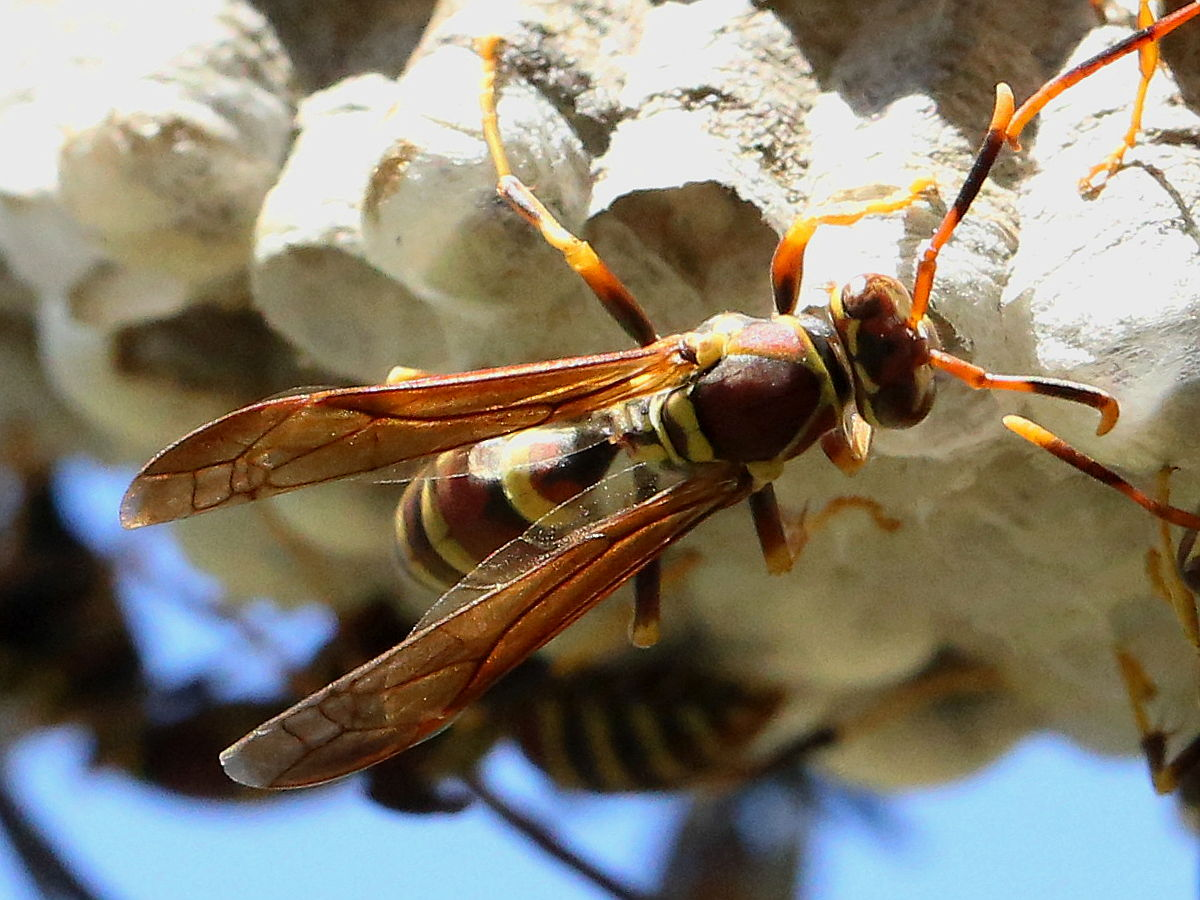
Nest in Molokai, Hawaii

Satellite nests are common among P. exclamans. A queen will fly somewhere between 0.15 and 11m away from the original nest to settle in a new location. About 16–39% of nests create satellites from May to July.

Similar to the wasp species Parischnogaster alternata, which constructs a multitude of nests in clusters in order to create protection through a dilution effect, the satellites are used as an insurance against attacks by predators and parasitoids. Of 12 nests that were knocked down by birds that had satellites, 66.7% of the colony survived by moving to the satellite, compared to the lower reproductive success of nests with no satellite that were attacked (5.7%). When Chalcoela iphitalis invades, the prevalence of satellites didn't increase the survivability, though it did have an effect when Elasmus polistis were introduced. It gave the P. exclamans a place to escape to.

Workers who are older typically start satellite nests and have more developed ovaries. Younger and lesser-developed workers join the satellite after its establishment. The distribution of workers between the main nest and satellite is very important because they are needed for the establishment of the satellite and for the continued running of the main nest, although after several months the main nest can become abandoned. If not enough workers follow the initial worker to the new nest, then it will most likely fail as a satellite.

== Interaction with other species ==
=== Parasitoids ===
Polistes exclamans live in social nests that are open combed. This leaves nests very susceptible to attacks by predators and by parasitoids. Attack by parasitoids will occur in the nest brood, as the invader will attempt to insert its own offspring into the host's nest. The two most common parasitoids are Chalcoela iphitalis and Elasmus polistis.

==== C. iphitalis and E. polistis ====
P. exclamans take several countermeasures against invasions. If the wasps detect an intruder they will violently bite and sting the location where the C. iphitalis moth has passed by. This will cause vibrations inside of the nest and the wasps inside will become alarmed and will move around jerkily. This phenomenon is known as the parasite dance. This will continue for up to 10 hours after the moth has been detected. If the moth is found it will be eaten immediately. However, this is not likely to happen. The moth lays its eggs in the nest, and when they hatch, they will take over the nest. As a result, many wasp pupae are aborted. This is commonly seen in the late summer when the moth is most abundant.

The second common parasitoid, Elasmus polistis, also has disastrous effects on the P. exclamans nest. Up to 80 E. polistis will hatch out of a single cell. The males emerge first, and then will exit the nest and wait until the females emerge. Once the females emerge, the males will mate and reproduce, quickly destroying the P. exclamans population. In some cases the invading E. polistis will hide larvae in the nest so that the P. exclamans cannot find them. This is important to the survival of P. exclamans. The hosts will attempt to remove as many parasitoids as possible to prevent them from spreading to nearby nests. This defense mechanism has not been proven to be effective, as more often than not the E. polistis larvae go undetected by the hosts. In one experiment conducted, it was found that over 60% of all nests lost brood to the parasitoids E. polistis or C. iphitalis in 1981. It was also observed that larger satellites have a greater risk of being parasitized. This is due to the fact that the large nests are typically older. This relationship between age and parasitism can be seen with the fact that older queens’ nests tend to be parasitized more than younger queens’ nests.

=== Predation ===
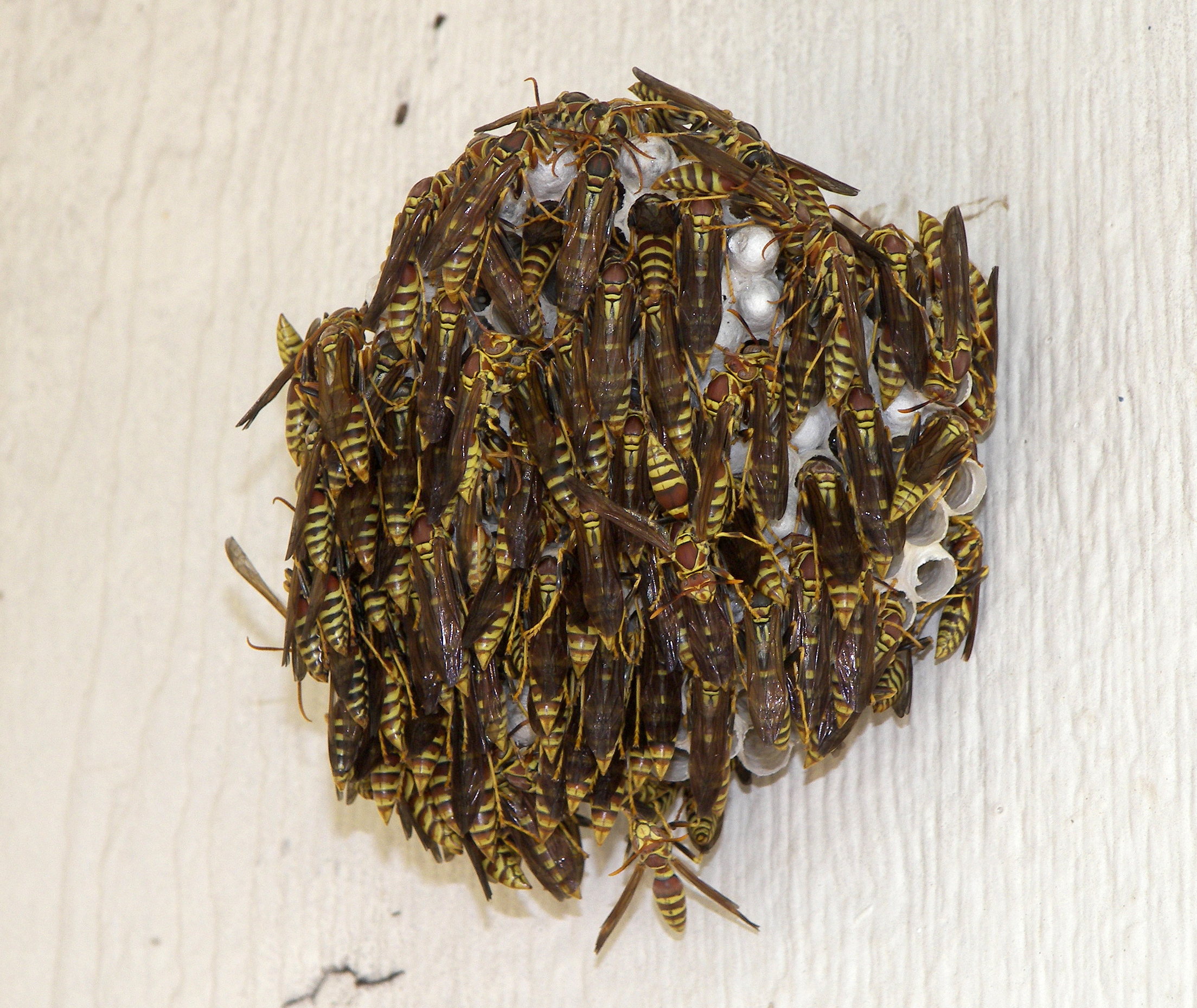
An overpopulated Polistes exclamans nest

P. exclamans has several different predators. Their most dangerous predators are birds, which will fly by and knock the nest to the ground. This phenomenon was discovered by the disappearance of nests, and wasp nests being found on the ground near the bird's nest. It has also been found that birds eat the larvae from the P. exclamans nest. This attack kills the whole nest but it isn't very effective against the adults from the colony. When attacked, the adults fly away either to another colony or a satellite colony.

Attack by the ant Crematogaster laeviuscula is different from attacks by birds. Rather than knocking down the nest, the ants swarm all over the nest and remove the brood from it. The ants destroy the entire brood but they are unable to kill the adults.

Other predators attack the adults while they are foraging or traveling to satellite nests. It is difficult to determine the number of adults that are killed away from the nest because they are difficult to track. However, it has been observed that the queen's flight to the satellite nest isn't dangerous and does not reduce its survivability.

The idea of group living has been discussed by many evolutionists for its costs and benefits. Alexander predicted that the cost to large groups is that they are more likely to suffer from parasitism, but at the same time, they benefit by defense against predation. This theory is not supported in the case of P. exclamans because the parasitism does not always increase with nest size and the predation rate was independent of size.

=== Colony defense ===
==== Facial patterns ====
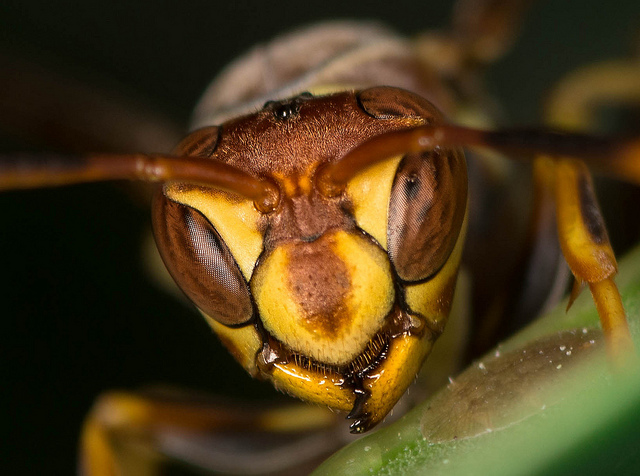
Face

Some animals may assess rivals through specific characteristics that are relevant to their fighting abilities; however, some animals, instead, use conventional characteristics to determine the competitive ability of their rivals. Conventional characteristics are signals that are indicative of the rival's abilities but are not a reflection of the animal's physiological or physical agonistic abilities. P. exclamans uses facial patterns as a conventional characteristic to determine the agonistic abilities of competitive rivals. Larger wasps have a greater amount of brown pigmented clypei. Wasps use these pigmented clypei to determine the viability of challenging a rival. The more pigmented the clypei or the larger the P. exclamans, the more likely the P. exclamans will be willing to challenge a rival. The less pigmented the clypei or the smaller the P. exclamans, the less willing it would be to challenge a rival. This assists in the minimization of the “costs of conflict during dominance competition among nest-founding queens.”

==== Alarm response ====
Polistes exclamans exhibit an alarm response, typical of many higher level eusocial Hymenoptera. Although it has been previously indicated that nest mates may alarm the rest of the nest through jerky movement and buzzing of wings, P. exclamans is capable of alarming the rest of the nest and attracting attacking wasps through chemical means by releasing a non-species-specific venomous alarm pheromone. Although a chemical signal to warn against attack would be evolutionarily adaptive, the P. exclamans only releases a response after the initial attack from and on the predator, as the venom is only released during the sting. This venom is capable of warning and coordinating a response from the nest and attracting nearby heterospecific or conspecific females from nearby colonies to attack the predator. This helps deter the predator from further attacking and is especially adaptive for the defense of the nest. Although certain other insects have been able to adapt the release of the pheromone to other means of communicating alarm, P. exclamans has yet to do so, indicating that it is still in its “primitive state in evolution of the complex systems of communication of alarm seen in higher social insects.” In one experiment, pheromones were extracted from female glands and sacs and were spread onto venom paper. It was then found that females were attracted upwind of the venom paper and some even attempted to sting it. This also had a heterospecific response where others also reacted to it. While it was found that one wasp couldn't release enough pheromones to elicit a response, if many individuals were alarmed they would elicit a response from the rest of the nest. However, this scent is not strong enough to reach other nests, and so neighboring nests must be alarmed by physical movements and wing flapping.

==== Queen response ====
After being invaded, a queen may be forced to leave her nest. If a satellite has not been established, the queen may usurp another queen in a different nest. Not having to invest any valuable resources, the queen can then use the new nest's resources on reproducing a new brood.
