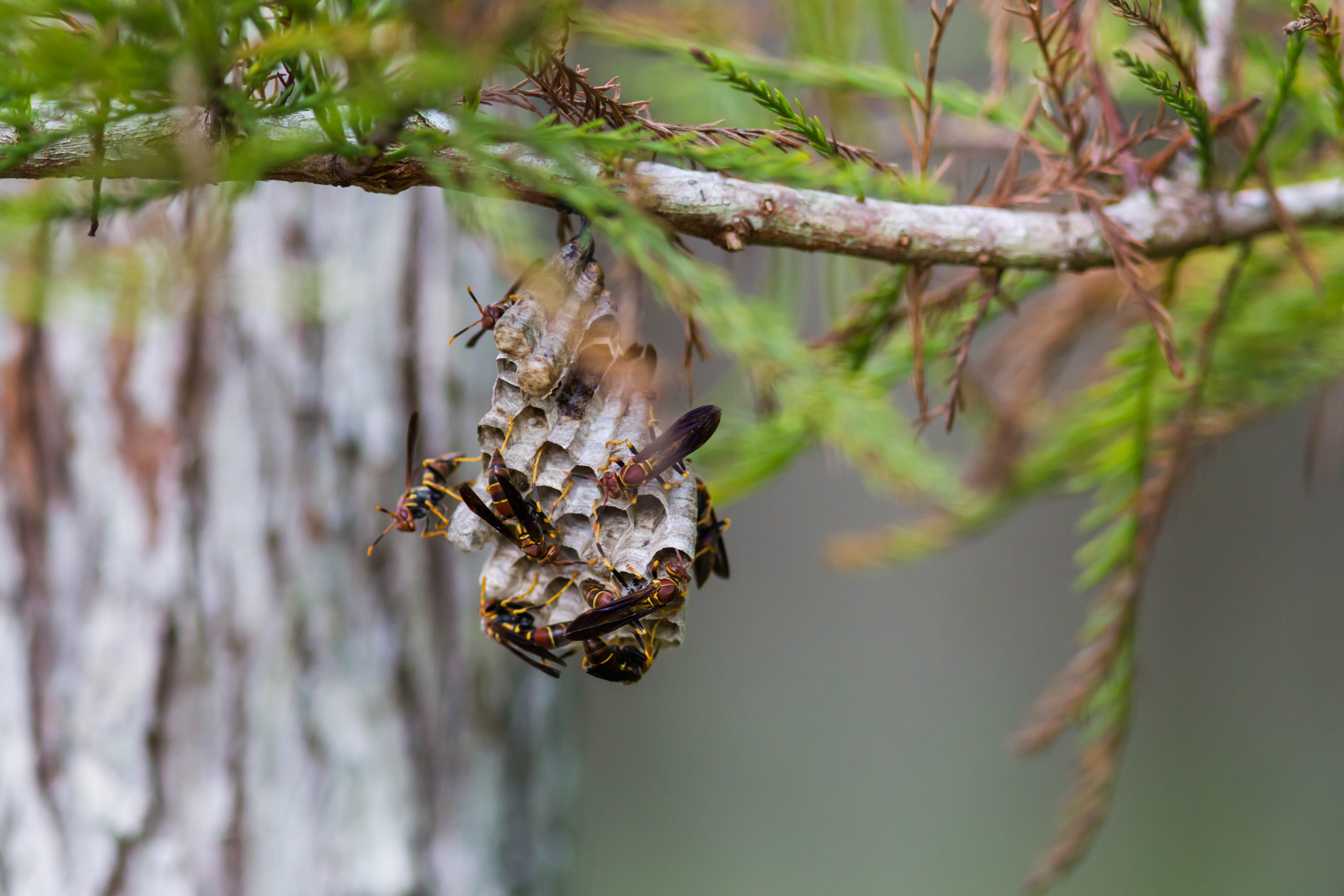

Scientific classification
- Domain: Eukaryota
- Kingdom: Animalia
- Phylum: Arthropoda
- Class: Insecta
- Order: Hymenoptera
- Family: Vespidae
- Subfamily: Polistinae
- Genus: Polistes
- Species: P. bahamensis

Binomial name
- Polistes bahamensis (Bequaert & Salt, 1931)

Synonyms
- Polistes bahamensis var. bahamensis Bequaert & Salt, 1931; Polistes bahamensis var. bilineolatus Bequaert & Salt, 1931; Polistes bahamensis var. picturatus Bequaert & Salt, 1931; Polistes exclamans var. bahamensis (Bequaert & Salt, 1931) Bequaert, 1940; Polistes exclamans var. bilineolatus (Bequaert & Salt, 1931) Bequaert, 1940; Polistes exclamans var. picturatus (Bequaert & Salt, 1931) Bequaert, 1940; Polistes exclamans var. louisianus Bequaert, 1940; Polistes exclamans ssp. bahamensis (Bequaert & Salt, 1931) Richards, 1978; Polistes exclamans ssp. bilineolatus (Bequaert & Salt, 1931) Richards, 1978; Polistes exclamans ssp. picturatus (Bequaert & Salt, 1931) Richards, 1978; Polistes exclamans ssp. louisianus (Bequaert, 1940) Richards, 1978

= Polistes bahamensis =

Species of wasp

Polistes bahamensis is a large species of colourful paper wasp in the genus Polistes of the family Vespidae which occurs in the Bahamas, Florida and Louisiana. It is also said to occur in Georgia.

== Taxonomy ==
It was first described as an endemic new species from the Bahamas by Joseph Charles Bequaert and George Salt in 1931, consisting of three varieties based on geography and patterns of coloured markings, P. bahamensis var. bahamensis, P. bahamensis var. bilineolatus and P. bahamensis var. picturatus. The nominate variety of bahamensis was reported to be an endemic of Andros Island, var. bilineolatus was only found in the central islands of New Providence and Eleuthera, and var. picturatus was known from Acklins, Mariguana, Rum Cay, Crooked Island, Long Island, Watlings Island and Cat Island. In 1940 Bequaert subsumed the species and its three varieties under P. exclamans, as well as described another new variety in that species, P. exclamans var. louisianus, from three female specimens caught in New Orleans.

In 1955 the variety louisianus was synonymised with P. exclamans sensu stricto by Roy Snelling, who stated that after examining large amounts of the wasps from two nests recovered in New Orleans, the vast majority of the individual wasps were typical nominate forms of exclamans, with only one or two individuals per nest displaying the colour patterns (reduced yellow markings) reported by Bequaert in 1940, and he furthermore states that he collected a single louisianus wasp in a very large colony of P. exclamans var. exclamans in Kansas. Snelling also expanded the distribution of the taxon outside of the Bahamas by reporting on the presence of P. exclamans var. bahamensis in southern Florida, stating some, but not all, of the 21 wasps collected in the Royal Palm State Park, a wooded grove which has now become the nucleus of the Everglades, and the nearby Archbold Biological Station were somewhat different in colouration with bahamensis, but that the collection of specimens as a whole integrated seamlessly with the colour pattern of insular specimens. Snelling continued to recognise the P. exclamans varieties bilineolatus and picturatus as Bahamanian endemics.

Bequaert and Salt's three or four varieties were then treated as subspecies of P. exclamans by Owain Richards in 1978.

Karl Vorse Krombein was apparently the first to associate the variety louisianus with P. exclamans var. bahamensis in 1979, attributing the synonymy to Snelling. In 1983 Snelling chose to re-recognise P. bahamensis as a valid species again, and while doing so synonymised the subspecies bilineolatus and picturatus and "reiterated" his conclusion regarding the variety louisianus -although by 1983 he was stating that he had synonymised it with bahamensis in 1955 instead of P. exclamans var. exclamans. By recognising the New Orleans specimens as bahamensis in 1983, Snelling effectively expanded the known distribution of this taxon hundreds of kilometres down the coast of the Gulf of Mexico. As of 2017 Kons and Rowan consider that all or at least part of the US population should be split off into a separate species, P. louisianus; -these writers believe that many Polistes species should be split into numerous sympatric species based on small differences in their body colour.

=== Etymology ===
The etymology of the specific epithet bahamensis is from the place 'the Bahamas', combined with the Latin suffix -ensis, meaning 'of, or from, (a place)' or 'pertaining to', together forming an adjective with the meaning: 'of the Bahamas'.

== Description ==
The identification of this species has always been very difficult. When Bequaert first examined the first three specimens from New Orleans around 1940, he at first thought them to be perhaps P. crinitus or P. versicolor introduced from the Caribbean. Snelling examined the same population and classified it as P. exclamans var. exclamans in 1955.

It has also been seen as very similar to P. annularis, with which it shares a slender first metasomal segment. It can be distinguished from this species by the yellow spot on the mesopleuron, and almost always having a yellow apical band on the posterior (back) margin of the tergites and more developed yellow markings on the mesosoma.

== Distribution ==
The known range has expanded as certain populations of wasps were determined to be this species, and with the collection of more specimens.

=== Bahamas ===
The first specimens were first collected on New Providence Island in 1909. Bequaert and Salt described the species in 1931 from specimens collected on Acklins, Andros Island, Cat Island, Crooked Island, Eleuthera, Long Island, Mariguana, New Providence Island, Rum Cay and Watlings Island. Specimens were first collected on Mayaguana in 1996, and the reported range was extended further to Great Inagua in 2011, with the species now believed to occur on all the major islands of the Bahamas,

=== United States ===
Snelling first extended the range of this species to southern Florida when he identified a group of specimens of wasps collected there since the late 1930s as belonging to this species in a 1955 article. The louisianus colour form described by Bequaert in 1940, considered a synonym of the nominate taxon of P. exclamans by Snelling at the time, was initially only known from New Orleans, but Snelling also described having seen a single individual in a nest of P. exclamans in Kansas. The taxon is included in the 1979 Catalog of Hymenoptera in America north of Mexico, which for some reason does not include endemic varieties found in the Bahamas as found in America north of Mexico, as a subspecies of P. exclamans. In this work louisianus is considered a synonym of P. exclamans var. bahamensis, and the distribution is given as from "Louisiana to Florida".

Snelling reported the presence of this taxon in the USA again in 1983, stating its range included Florida, Georgia and Louisiana. A photograph of a number of wasps building a nest in coastal North Carolina in 2017 has been identified as being of this species.

== Ecology ==
It has usually been recorded nesting under eaves of roofs of buildings and sometimes under palm fronds. The nest is suspended from an attachment stalk known as a petiole.

As of 2017, no Strepsipteran parasites are reported for P. bahamensis.

== Conservation ==
It is quite common in the centre of its range, such as on New Providence Island, especially in urban areas such as the capital city Nassau. In common with most species, the abundance diminishes at the edges of its distribution, being quite rare on Great Inagua and Mayaguana and "sporadic" along the Gulf Coast of Florida.

The IUCN has not evaluated this species' conservation status.

It has been recorded as present in the following protected areas:

- Archbold Biological Station, Lake Placid, Highlands County, Florida, USA.
- Emeralda Marsh Conservation Area, Lake County, Florida, USA.
- Inagua National Park, Great Inagua, the Bahamas.
- Everglades National Park, Florida, USA.
- Watermelon Pond Wildlife Management Area, Alachua County, Florida, USA.
