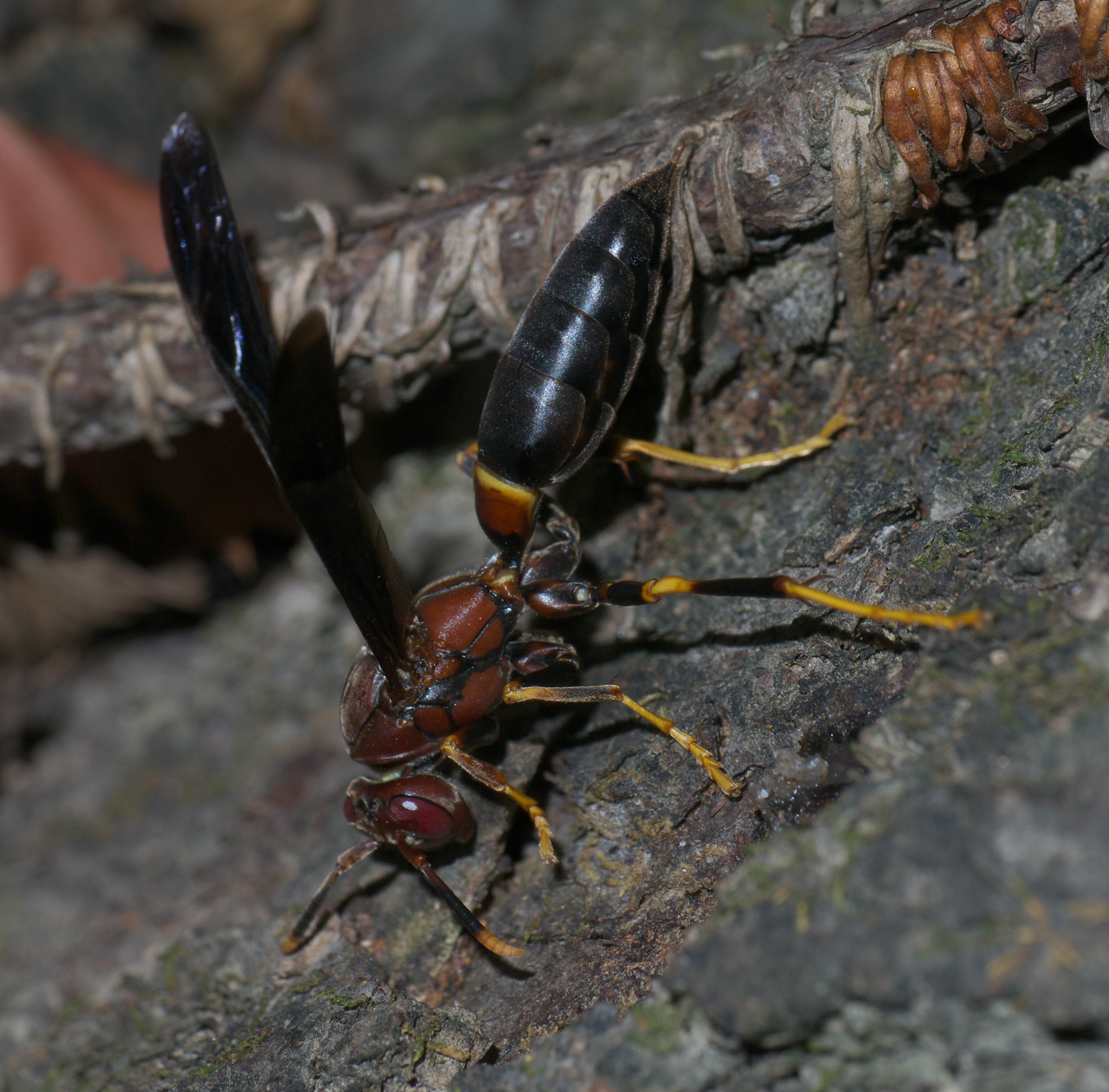
- Polistes annularis photographed in Oklahoma

Scientific classification
- Kingdom: Animalia
- Phylum: Arthropoda
- Clade: Pancrustacea
- Class: Insecta
- Order: Hymenoptera
- Family: Vespidae
- Genus: Polistes
- Species: P. annularis

Binomial name
- Polistes annularis (Linnaeus, 1763)

Synonyms
- Vespa annularis Linnaeus, 1763; Vespa cincta Drury, 1773

= Polistes annularis =

Species of wasp

Polistes annularis is a species of paper wasp found throughout the eastern half of the United States. This species of red paper wasp is known for its large size and its red-and-black coloration and is variably referred to as a ringed paper wasp or jack Spaniard wasp. It builds its nest under overhangs near bodies of water that minimize the amount of sunlight penetration. It clusters its nests together in large aggregations, and consumes nectar and other insects. Its principal predator is the ant, although birds are also known to prey on it. Unlike other wasps, P. annularis is relatively robust in winter conditions, and has also been observed to store honey in advance of hibernation. This species has also been used as a model species to demonstrate the ability to use microsatellite markers in maternity assignment of social insects.

== Taxonomy and phylogeny ==
The first description of P. annularis was published by Carl Linnaeus in his 1763 Centuria Insectorum, where he named the species Vespa annularis. It was moved to the genus Polistes by Johan Christian Fabricius in 1804, two years after Pierre André Latreille had erected the new genus. Within the genus Polistes, P. annularis is placed in the New World subgenus Polistes (Aphanilopterus), which contains 52 species, including its allies P. exclamans, P. bahamensis, and P. erythrocephalus. Members of this subgenus are noted for their slender first abdominal segment and often orange antennal tips. The subgenus Aphanilopterus, including P. annularis, diverged from the sister subgenus Fuscopolistes (including the common P. bellicosus, P. carolina, P. metricus, and P. fuscatus) between 10 and 80 million years ago. The genus Polistes is placed in the monotypic tribe Polistini within the subfamily Polistinae (paper wasps). Polistinae contains two main behavioral groups: wasps which form nests with large number of workers, and those wasps which found nests with few workers and foundresses (the latter including P. annularis). This subfamily likely arose in the mid- to late Jurassic period, around 145 to 175 million years ago. Polistinae is further placed within the Vespidae as its second-largest subfamily. Other sister members of Vespidae include the yellowjackets, hornets, potter wasps, mason wasps, and pollen wasps.

=== Etymology ===
The genus name Polistes is most likely derived from the Greek polistēs (πολιστής) which is translated as “founder of a city”. The specific epithet comes from the Latin word ānnulāris, an alternate spelling of ānulāris. The root word ānnulus is a noun, meaning 'ring', and -ālis is a suffix that modifies a noun into an adjective. Together, the word ānulāris means "ringed", "ring-shaped", or "annular".

== Description and identification ==
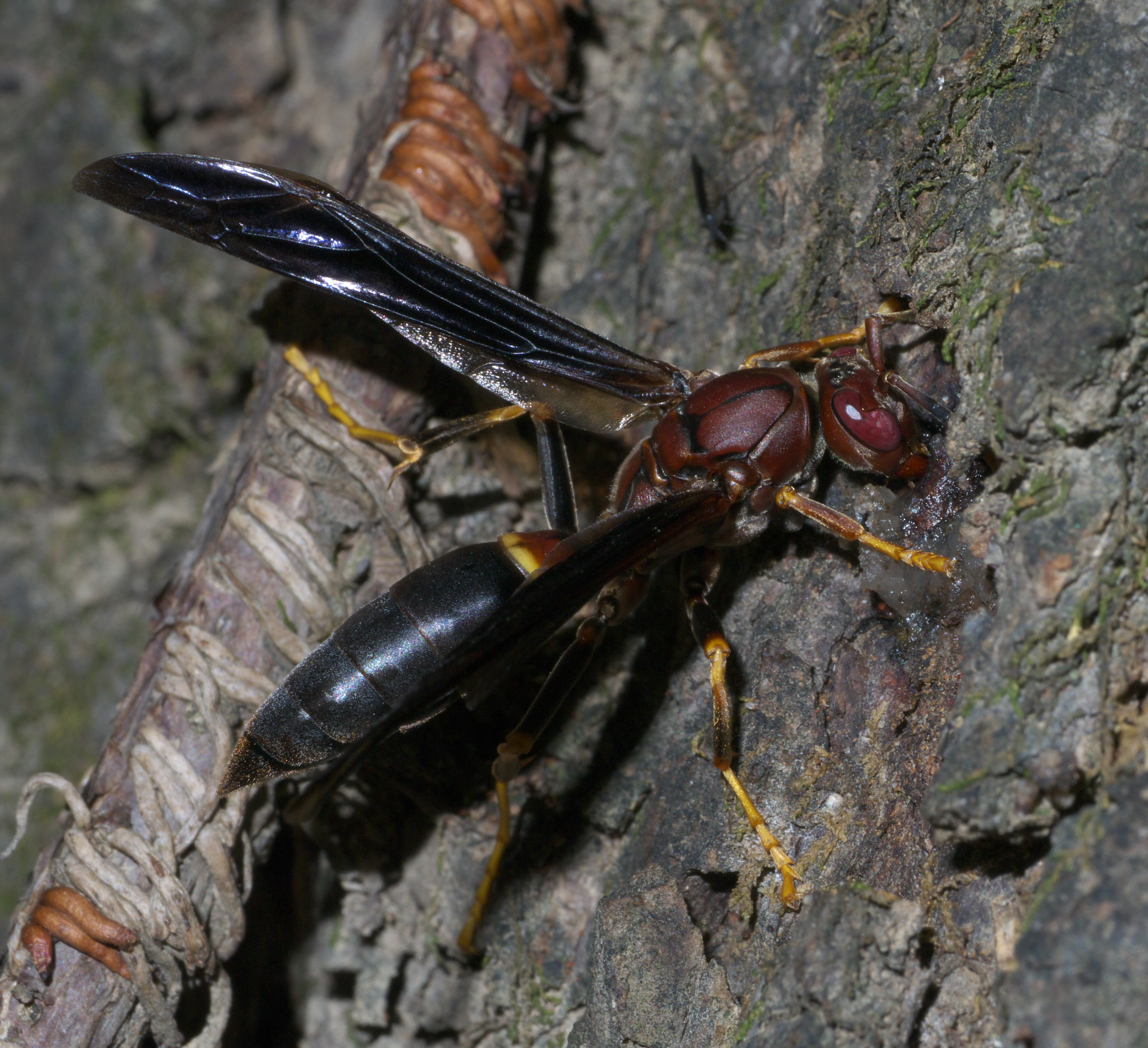
Polistes annularis, jack Spaniard wasp

Polistes annularis, as a member of the subgenus Polistes (Aphanilopterus), has a narrow first metasomal segment and bright orange antennal segments. Within its range of the eastern United States, these traits are shared with its allies P. exclamans and P. bahamensis. The coloration of P. annularis typically includes a ferruginous (rust-red) head and thorax and a mostly black abdomen with a single, prominent yellow ring and the end of the first segment. There is geographical variation in coloration between northern and southern populations. In the north, the thorax of P. annularis has ferruginous (rust-red) markings on a predominantly black background, while in the south, the thorax is mostly ferruginous, with black markings. The legs also vary from black to ferruginous. In terms of size, the fore wings are 18.5–23.5 mm (0.73–0.93 in) long in females, and 17.5–19.5 mm (0.69–0.77 in) long in males.

Polistes annularis can be separated from darker members of P. bahamensis, a species only overlapping from Florida to Louisiana and North Carolina, by the lack of yellow markings on its mesopleuron, less developed yellow markings on the mesosoma, and the lack of additional apical yellow bands on the tergum. Similarly colored members of the subgenus Fuscopolistes, including P. metricus and darker forms of P. fuscatus, can readily be separated by the lack of contrasting orange antennal tips and the wider first metasomal segment.

While many other North American Polistes species show sexual dimorphism in coloration, P. annularis and P. erythrocephalus rather uniquely do not. Within these species, the males lack extensive yellow markings on the face, and instead both males and females are red-faced. Instead, sexual determination must rely entirely on structural differences. The females are identified by having 12 antennal segments and 6 abdominal segments whereas the males are identified by having 13 antennal segments and 7 abdominal segments.

In the genus Polistes, the lateral mandibular groove is smaller in size than in other genera of social wasps. This groove is associated with the mandibular gland and sac-like gland reservoir used for salivary production. Their larvae have labial glands, which produce silk.

== Distribution and habitat ==
Polistes annularis is found throughout the eastern United States from New York to Florida, west to a line from South Dakota to Texas. This range is similar to that of P. metricus, with which P. annularis is a Müllerian mimic.

Polistes annularis forms its nests on the branches of trees and shrubs, as well as in sheltered parts of some buildings. However, it is also known to group its nests in large colonies called aggregations. These tend to be built on the underside of overhangs that block exposure to sunlight for most of the day, such as rocky cliffs, in close proximity to bodies of water, primarily riversides. These overhangs are a limiting factor to nest building. The nests differ markedly from those of other species in the genus Polistes. They are much larger, with around 500 cells, and are wide, rather than the slender, elongated nests seen in some other species. P. annularis construct nests made of paper that have cells exposed to the external environment.

== Colony cycle ==
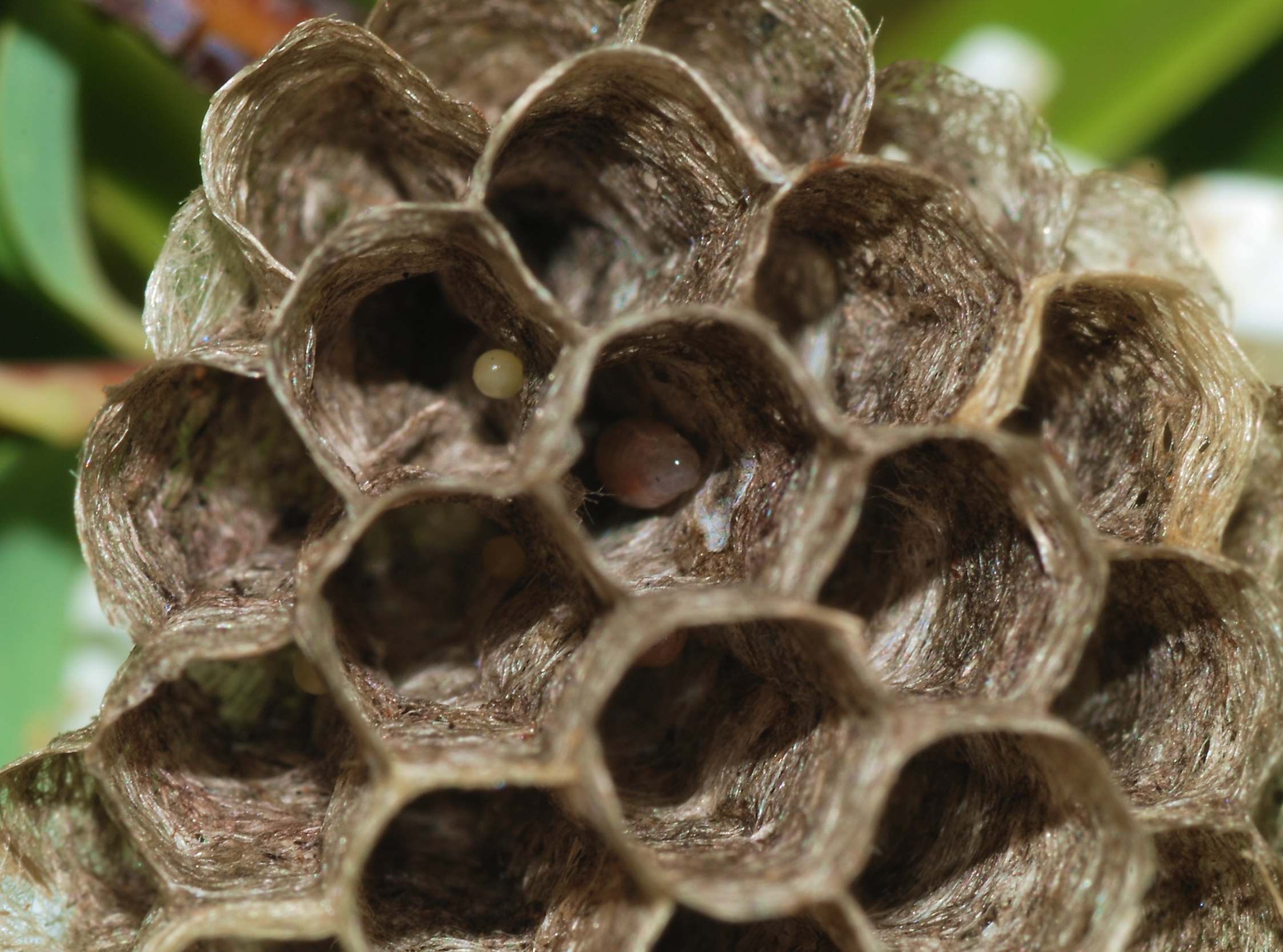
Characteristic structure of a paper wasp nest

During the springtime, mated foundress wasps emerge from hibernation within cracks of rocky cliff walls. Returning to the area of their natal nests from the previous year, they begin construction of new paper nests typically within a few meters of their natal nests, though generally without reusing the cells of the old nest. A single nest may be built by a group of foundresses, termed "associations", which are usually came from the same natal nest. This group averages at five foundresses though may vary from a single foundress to an association of up to 22 cooperating foundresses. Of this association, a single foundress establishes a dominance hierarchy, with the dominant foundress laying the majority of the eggs.

Meanwhile, the others construct the nest, from plant fibers, combined with oral secretions, to make a papery pulp that is formed into cells. The nest is attached to an overhang by a stalk-like pedicel, composed of oral secretions including proteins rich in glycine, proline, alanine, and serine, common components of the silks of other insects. Another minor component is N-acetylglucosamine, which is probably bound to the pedicel protein. Proline is a major component of structural proteins and likely contributes to the structural strength of the pedicel in holding up the rest of the nest. The pedicel suspends the nest high in the air and precludes many predators from getting close to the nest.

These other foundresses also forage for food, provisioning the larvae with chunks of caterpillar, as well as defend the nest. However, unlike in other eusocial Hymenoptera, these wasps tend to act as independent agents. While the queen is at the top of the dominance hierarchy, the other wasps may lay eggs and forage for themselves as they see fit. In cases where queens or foundresses evict other females, the aggregations begin to dissolve. At nighttime and in the early morning, the entire female population of a P. annularis colony is located on the nest. After the first brood pupate by spinning a cocoons that encloses the larval cell, they emerge as adults. The co-foundresses then remain on the nest with the dominant foundress until dying off.

The first brood of offspring in the spring is primarily composed of non-reproductive female workers, with few if any males. Later generations beginning in the summer produce female reproductives, depending on ambient conditions, and then male reproductives. A few days after adult males emerge, they leave their natal nest to mate. Although the probability is very low, a worker herself can eventually mate and assume the role of queen in the event that all foundresses of the nest die or leave permanently. Between mid-July and mid-October, P. annularis nests arrest their brood production.

Beginning during early to mid autumn as the temperature drops below about 5 °C and the workers die off, reproductive females prepare for winter by collecting and storing nectar in a highly concentrated form within open cells of the natal nest that eventually becomes a sort of honey. By the winter, these reproductive females abandon the nest to hibernate, residing in shelters known as hibernacula, which include cracks within cliff walls. During cold conditions as compared to normal foraging temperatures, both sexes have increased levels of trehalose, and females also have increased levels of glucose and fructose. Foundresses have higher storage capability for glycogen than workers, allowing them to better survive low temperatures that causes workers to die. Males, which often higher levels of glucose, fructose, and trehalose than foundresses, are able to continue mating into autumn or winter. P. annularis cannot tolerate frost, though it has been shown to be able to survive at temperatures below the minimum temperature in the area in which it resides. On warmer days of the winter, they fly back to the natal nest to feed on their stored honey, increasing their ability to survive the cold of winter, as well as interact with their nest-mates. In early January, reproductive males and females commence mating at the hibernacula. In the following spring, foundresses are retain association with their nestmates from the natal nest of the previous autumn and begin the colony cycle anew.

=== Variations in the colony cycle ===
The colony cycle of P. annularis exhibits slight variations from year to year based on environmental conditions. One factor is the ability of females to switch castes. After the early brood of workers emerge from the eggs, the nest usually the original reproductive foundress before more eggs can be laid at the end of the season. In this case, a worker with fully developed ovaries takes over the nest and becomes a gyne. However, this also results in an earlier arrest in rearing brood, which may be due to a decrease in relatedness between the new reproductive and the nascent females or due to internal conflict on the nest. Additionally, if resources decrease, as during a drought, brood rearing ends sooner than in more prosperous years, and females choose to become gynes as opposed to workers.

The reproductive females of P. annularis tend to outlive the subordinate co-foundresses of their association. Through the course of the colony cycle, the number of mated workers increases along with the queen's pronounced shows of dominance over the nest. In general, foundresses have greater inclusive fitness if they are associated with smaller colonies. Notably, nests built by a lone foundresses tend to produce far more offspring than do the subordinate co-foundresses of other nests. The ability of a lone foundress to found a nest is likely correlated to her body size in terms of the length of her wings, the mass of her body minus water weight, and the mass of her body fat. From the moment that a foundress is established in the association of a new nest, she will from then on remain at that nest unless her proper nest is wrecked. In the event of a destroyed nest, a foundress may occasionally enter into the association of another nest's foundresses who originally came from her same natal nest.

== Behavior ==
=== Diet ===
Polistes annularis hunts mostly in wooded areas and preys primarily on caterpillars from a large number of lepidopteran families, including the Arctiidae, Saturniidae, Geometridae, Limacodidae, Lymantriidae, Notodontidae, Nymphalidae, Sphingidae, Erebidae, Noctuidae, Amphisbatidae, and Elachistidae. They may also hunt flies, moths, butterflies, and other insects. Due to the dominance hierarchy, the reproductive foundress leaves the nest as little as possible, with foraging being done primarily by non-reproductive, worker wasps on her behalf. Only in small nests, with two or three foundresses, the queen may have to forage as well. As soon as the brood of workers emerge as adults, they take over the role of foraging. This prey represents only 20% of food resources; the other 80% is liquid.

=== Dominance hierarchy ===
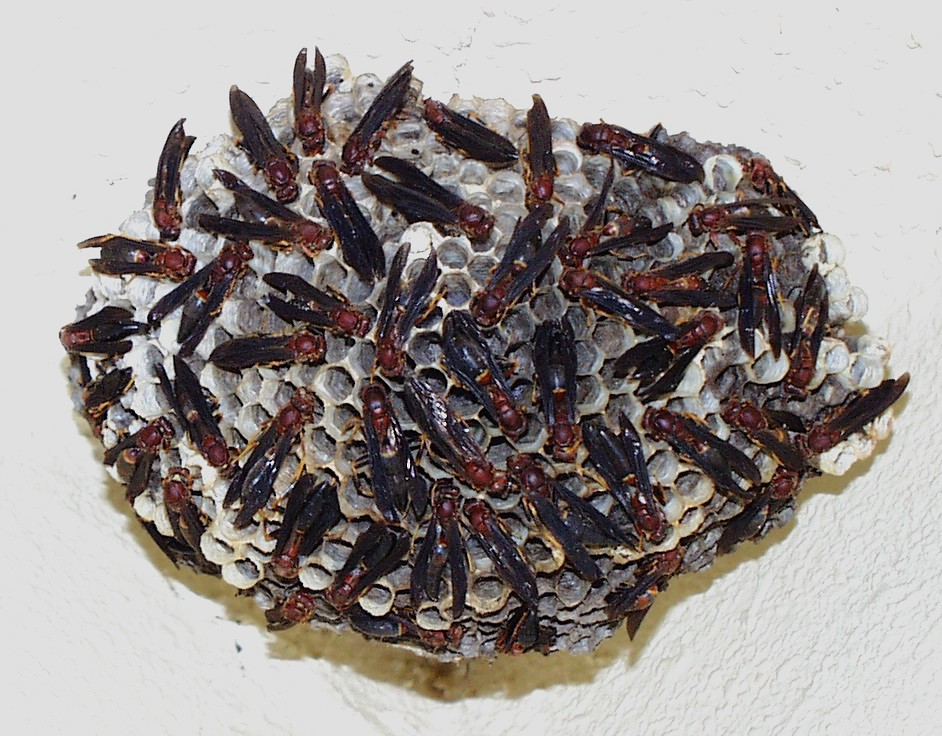
Polistes annularis at a mature nest

Polistes annularis is a primitively eusocial wasp, meaning that all individuals have the capacity for reproduction, regardless of social caste. Similar primitive eusociality has been seen in bees as well, including sweat bees such as Lasioglossum zephyrus. As such, P. annularis demonstrates behavior typical of other polistine wasps, and has a dominance hierarchy, relatively small colony size compared to yellowjacket species, and a female-biased sex ratio. This dominance hierarchy is due to group competition over scarce resources.|

Dominant females chew on or attack other colony members to demonstrate power, and this higher caste has a propensity for "tail-wagging" and checking cells as compared to the lower ranked workers, similar to behavior in Polistes dominula. A female on the nest will engage the arrival of a wasp from another colony with her antennae, and the clash may last for several minutes and even escalate into grappling. Many of these behaviors are the result of high reproductive competition between females.

The reproductive females, or queens, usually lay the highest percentage of eggs though may occasionally allow subordinates to do so as well. The queens are more active on larger and newer nests. Despite the hierarchy and its dependence on queen size, larger queens do not necessarily inhibit egg laying by subordinates better than smaller queens. However, queens do develop far larger and more developed ovaries than their subordinates, and often have more mature eggs within.

Much of this dominance hierarchy in P. annularis is dependent on dry weight, residue weight, wing length, and fat content. Thus, females from different nests exhibit greater variation in these factors, while females originating from the same natal nest exhibit greater similarity. In atypical cases, the queen may be smaller in terms of these factors than some of the workers on the nest. Generally, wasps that are heavier and have higher fat content have greater ovarian development, with dry weight correlating more heavily with ovarian development than any other parameter. These trends in ovarian development has also been correlated with dominance hierarchy in members of other subgenera, including Polistes gallicus of the subgenus Polistes (Polistes) and Polistes metricus of the subgenus Polistes (Fuscopolistes).

=== Foundress associations ===
Group nesting through associations is especially prevalent and varied in P. annularis, with an arithmetic mean of between 3.82 and 4.93 and a full range from one to 28. Variation from year to year explains only 2% of the variance in the size of associations. Only 5% of queens run a nest without any co-foundresses, while about three-quarters of foundresses become subordinate to a queen on a cooperative nest. The largest aggregations of foundresses are seen when females reuse the nest in which they were born, typically by constructing a new nest on the old one. In cases where females reuse the natal nest, between seven and eight foundresses are typically active on the nest, as compared to an average of 4.34 for wholly new nests.

The number of foundresses plays a major role in determining the success of a colony. On average, colonies have a 60% success rate for producing workers and 65% for reproductives. However, nests with one foundress are only 20% successful at surviving until workers emerge. Nests with four or more foundresses have an 80% chance of success. Strangely, the inclusive fitness of subordinate foundresses is lower than their fitness in the case where they established a nest alone; it remains unclear why such subordinates do not leave the nest to establish their own.

Selective pressure tends to eliminate any additional foundresses once workers emerge due to multiple factors. Firstly, foundresses compete with each other over the scarcity of space and resources to raise the best offspring. Secondly, workers can perform all the same functions as foundresses with minimal competition. Lastly, workers are more related to their sisters than their own offspring and thus have less incentive to lay their own eggs. These factors together result in the expulsion of the subordinate foundresses, as first observed in the related P. gallicus.

Subordinate foundress mortality significantly increases following worker emergence as compared to mortality rates prior to worker emergence, a pattern also observed in P. exclamans and P. carolina but not in P. bellicosus. Likewise, subordinates decrease foraging rate following worker emergence. However, unlike other polistine wasps, more severe consequences occur for P. annularis after worker emergence, despite this change in behavior. The intricacies of this conundrum remain unsolved though are suspected to deal with senescence as decreased foraging also accompanies decreased aggression. Foundress eviction, as studied across polistine wasps, is independent of the rate of usurpation, which is 9% in P. annularis. In cases when all foundresses are evicted, colony failure rate is high with 19% failing when multiple foundresses are evicted and 80% failing in cases where a sole-founding foundress is evicted. By the time pupae appear, queens are less aggressive towards their subordinates, as compared to when only larvae are present. This behavior of queen eviction has parallels in other social insects, including ants and termites.

=== Kin recognition and conflict ===
In contrast to allied species, P. annularis have a lesser to absent ability to identify their relatedness to other workers to improve inclusive fitness. Instead of beginning spring nests only between the most related foundresses from a natal nest, they do not show any preference for the nest whose members to which they are most genetically related. In cases of sisters born from the same foundress and male pair, the siblings have a relatedness of 3/4. However, sisters that do not share both parents have much lower relatedness. While all of the foundresses of a novel nest come from the same, common natal nest, the workers may choose whichever nest association they wish to join in the spring.

However, P. annularis do possess cuticular hydrocarbons on the surface of their bodies that may serve as social recognition factors. For instance, while males have the same hydrocarbon compounds, the ratio of these compounds differs from females. In males, the dominant component, at 21%, is 3-methylnonacosane. Differences are also known to exist to separate the larvae, dominated by 13- and 15-methylnonacosane at 15%, and the eggs, dominated by 3-methylnonacosane as in the males though at 23%. Additionally, the lipids in the nest paper probably function in kin recognition among workers.

The matter of sex ratio is related. Within the genus Polistes, sex ratios tend to be biased at 3:1 towards females within northern ranges versus nearly 1:1 in southern ranges. For example, the related P. exclamans, which shares much of its eastern range with P. annularis and has a comparable relatedness between sisters of 0.39, may be a valid proxy in determining the sex allocation patterns of P. annularis. Members of the brood are highly related to the queen, but are less related to the subordinates and their mates, aligning more with a 1:1 sex ratio. As such, it is to the benefit of the wasp to be a reproductive queen as opposed to a worker, if feasible.

In situations where a nest no longer has a reproductive foundress, the remaining foundresses compete for dominance of the nest. These attacks routinely occur and increase over several weeks, during which nest construction and oviposition come to a stop, until certain wasps remit to leave room for a new queen. Often, this successor is the next oldest foundress, due to her size and position in the dominance hierarchy. Following succession, subordinates also may then be chased from the nest. The new queen will lay more eggs than her beta subordinate co-foundresses, inducing the ovaries of other workers to decrease in size, to the point that they will be eliminated following the hatching of new workers. Once a foundress succeeds as the new queen, additional aggression stops; however, if the successor is a worker, aggression tends to rise as the dominance hierarchy has not been well established. Despite aggressions after the removal of a queen, brood care does not decrease.

=== Colony aggregation ===
Polistes annularis tends to form nests in crowded clumps due to the constraint of suitable nesting sites with overhangs that minimize sunlight exposure, have minimal flooding, and are near a body of water. Consequently, nests often are formed in crowded aggregations on the same overhang. One cost of this crowding is the direct reproductive competition between colonies in the form of usurpation of a colony queen by a female from another colony. As a result, the original queen may be fought to the death, until being banished by the colony, or until becoming a reproductive subordinate. Unlike suggested by selfish herd, no advantage is seen for a colony to be in the center of the aggregation, further from predators. For comparison, the temperate species Ropalidia plebeiana from Australia that also forms nest aggregations tends to gain joint protection from predators for the entire aggregation. Instead, the cost of reproductive competition for colonies in the center of the aggregation is increased relative to colonies closer to the edge. Also, no advantage exists for a new colony to be established in close proximity to its preceding natal colony.

=== Altruism ===
As with many other species in the Hymenoptera, as well as other polistine wasps, P. annularis has been noted to engage in altruistic behavior. For example, despite the lack of drastic morphological differentiation between workers and foundresses, and the benefits procured by a worker becoming a foundress on a new nest, a worker may lay less than 10% as many eggs as her queen, independent of the number of females on the nest. This results in vastly decreased inclusive fitness for the worker and greatly increased inclusive fitness of the foundress, even if the sisters are related by a factor of 0.75, the maximum possible relatedness for outbred sisters. The workers acting in such a manner may create a direct cost upon which selection can act. However, evidence for this has been scant, and researchers are currently investigating why and how such levels of altruism are sustained in P. annularis.

== Interaction with other species ==
Birds often try to knock nests of P. annularis off of their overhanging, and colonies that hang low toward the ground can be attacked and eaten by raccoons. During the warmer days of winter, wasps returning to their natal nest for honey are exposed to attack from other members of the species, wasps of other species including yellowjackets, and from mammals. However, Polistes species have evolved to hide their nests from most mammals or put them in areas as to make them inaccessible. Invading insects are attacked. Despite the fact that birds are common enemies of polistine wasps, none has been observed attacking nests for honey. The principal predators are ants, so the pedicel of the nest contains lipids that provoke a necrophoric response from ants, protecting the nest from ant invasion. It is parasitized by Elasmus polistis and the moth Chalcoela iphitalis. P. annularis defends itself and its nest from threats with its sting, and the antigen 5 in their venom is a major allergen.
