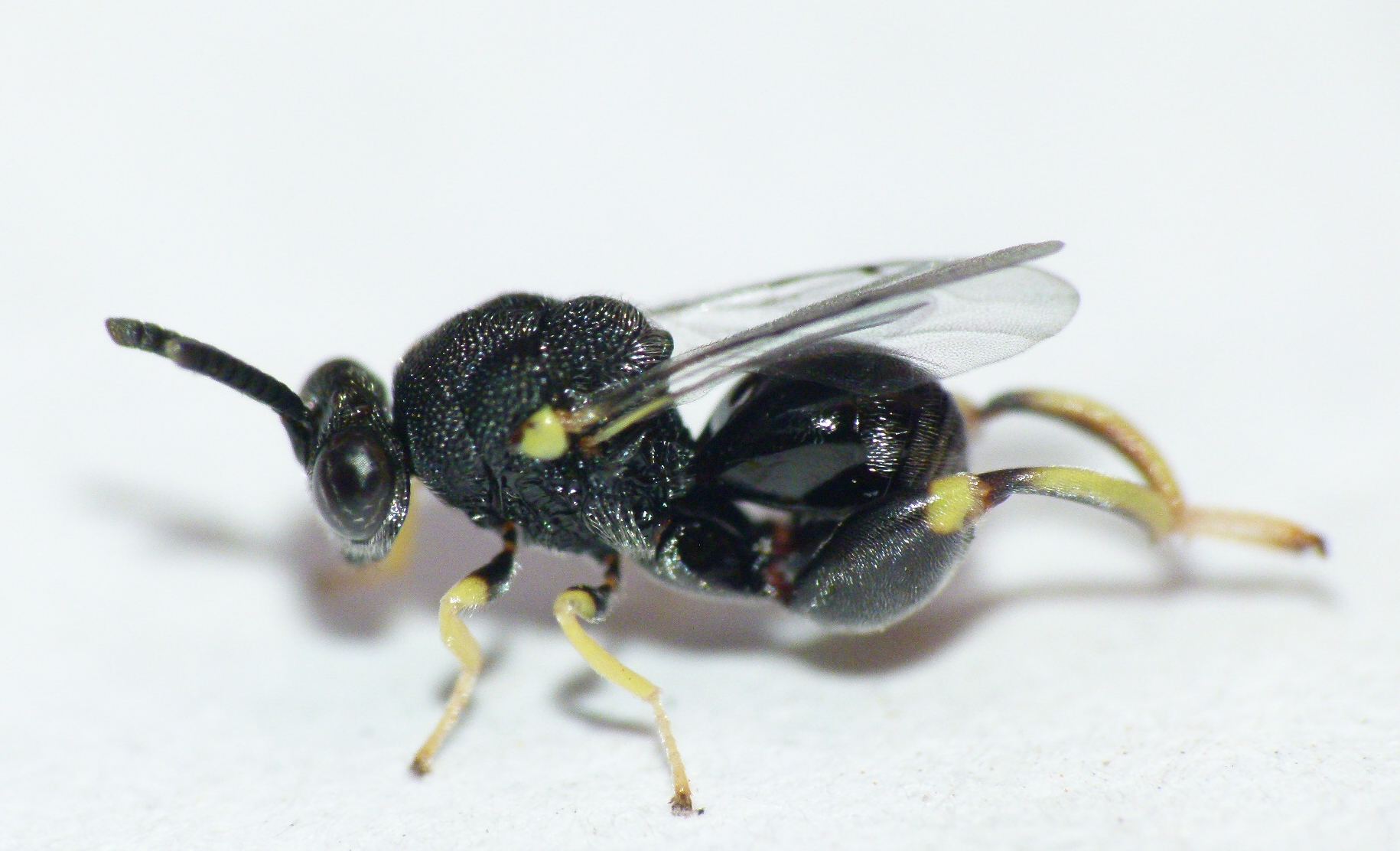
- Adult Brachymeria that has emerged from a pupa of Euploea core

Scientific classification
- Kingdom: Animalia
- Phylum: Arthropoda
- Class: Insecta
- Order: Hymenoptera
- Family: Chalcididae
- Subfamily: Brachymeriinae
- Genus: Brachymeria; Westwood, 1829

Species
- Over 300, see text

= Brachymeria =

Genus of wasps

Brachymeria is a genus of parasitic wasps in the family Chalcididae. Over 300 species are known worldwide, all of them parasites of insect pupae. Most species are black with limited yellow markings, and like most chalcidid wasps, they have enlarged hind femora. The female typically lays eggs inside the pupae of a lepidopteran using its ovipositor. Although mostly parasitic on Lepidoptera, a few are hyperparasites (parasites of parasitic Hymenoptera and Diptera), or attack other types of insect larvae (such as Polistes erythrocephalus). The adult parasites emerge typically from the host pupa. Some species have been used in biological control.
