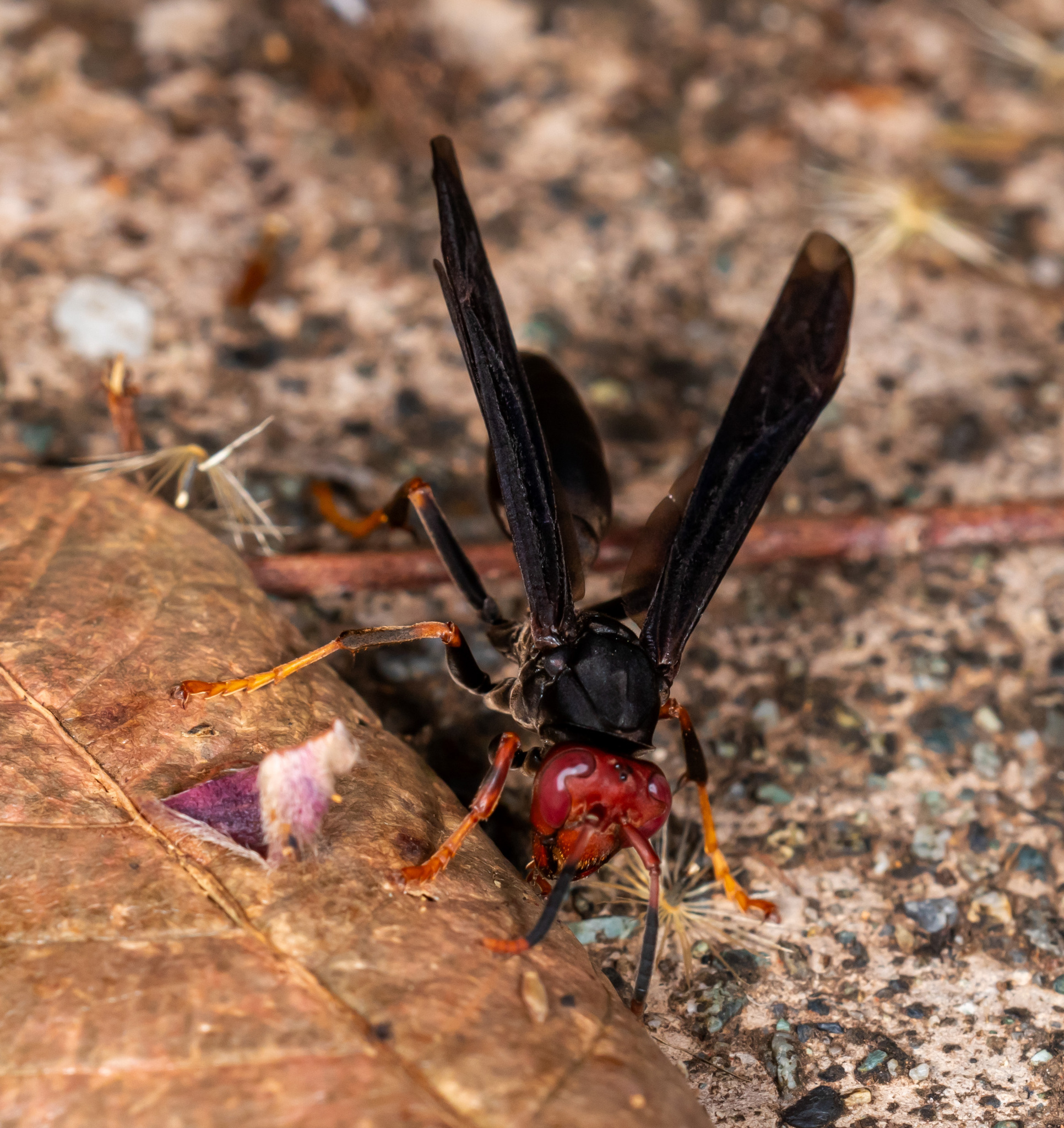
- Polistes erythrocephalus in Jericó, Colombia

Conservation status
- Data Deficient (IUCN 3.1)

Scientific classification
- Kingdom: Animalia
- Phylum: Arthropoda
- Clade: Pancrustacea
- Class: Insecta
- Order: Hymenoptera
- Family: Vespidae
- Subfamily: Polistinae
- Tribe: Polistini
- Genus: Polistes
- Species: P. erythrocephalus

Binomial name
- Polistes erythrocephalus (Latreille, 1813)

Synonyms
- Polistes canadensis erythrocephalus

= Polistes erythrocephalus =

Species of wasp

Polistes erythrocephalus is a species of paper wasp in the subfamily Polistinae of family Vespidae found in Central and South America. P. erythrocephalus is a eusocial wasp, meaning that it possesses both reproductive and non-reproductive castes. The cooperation between the two castes to raise young demonstrates the altruistic nature of these wasps. P. erythrocephalus exhibits a four-stage colony cycle, as do many other Polistes wasps. This species generally feeds on larvae, occasionally their own, and is preyed upon by species such as army ants.

== Taxonomy and phylogeny ==
Polistes scholars such as K. Yoshikawa, Joseph Charles Bequaert, and Mary Jane West-Eberhard, originally considered Polistes erythrocephalus to be a subspecies of Polistes canadensis. For this reason, much of the research done on P. erythrocephalus has been classified under P. canadensis. Additionally, it was left out of Yoshikawa's list of Polistes species around the world in 1963. More recently however P. erythrocephalus has been recognized as a separate species by Owain Richards though it is sometimes still referred to as Polistes canadensis erythrocephalus. Its closest relatives are Polistes canadensis, Polistes annularis, and Polistes infuscatus.

== Description and identification ==
Polistes erythrocephalus is about 21 millimetres (0.83 in) in length and is characterized by its black thorax and abdomen. P. erythrocephalus bodies are typically narrower than those of its closest relatives such as Polistes annularis. The thorax is unmarked and the abdomen is slightly shinier than the rest of the body. This black body color contrasts with the color of its head which is a dull ferruginous (rust) color. On top of the head are ferruginous colored antenna which grow paler at the tips. P. erythrocephalus wings are dark bluish in color and have a noticeable glossy sheen. P. erythrocephalus legs are black with yellowish hues at the tarsi and knee joints.

For a long time P. erythrocephalus was considered to be a subspecies of P. canadensis and thus the two were often confused. However, P. canadensis possesses a ferruginous thorax, abdomen, and head. Additionally, the wings of P. canadensis are often a much lighter color than its body.

=== Sexual dimorphism ===
Male and female P. erythrocephalus are hard to distinguish unless they are observed at a close distance. Under close examination the abdomen of female P. erythrocephalus has six banded segments while male abdomens contain seven. In addition the females abdomen narrows to a point with a stinger at the end. The male abdomen on the other hand is more rounded and does not contain a stinger. Female antennas also have 12 segments and are hooked at the end while males have 13 segments and have a more subtle curve. It has been suggested that such sexual dimorphic traits within a species occur to make females more recognizable. This recognition makes it easier to kick males out of nests so that they can disperse and encounter more foundresses. Sexual dimorphism also allows males to more quickly recognize females, thus, providing the benefit of not having to waste time accidentally trying to mate with other males.

=== Nests ===
Like most paper wasps Polistes erythrocephalus construct their nests by chewing plant and wood fibers with saliva to create a paper-maché-like material. When dried, their nests are somewhat horizontal and due to the divergence of cells have a concave upper surface. P. erythrocephalus nesting habits are very similar to P. annularis in that they prefer to build their nests in areas protected from direct sunlight, rain, wind, and other insects. The locations in which they find this protection vary greatly from the countryside to the city. P. erythrocephalus in urban areas have been observed to build nests under the eaves of roofs, under the wood of basement floors, in barns/stables, under bridges, and in lofts. This species also appears to prefer to build nests in close proximity to a water source. In more rural areas nests are found in clear areas such as the trunk of a solitary tree or the underside of a large Heliconia leaf. In these cases several nests can be built on the same tree at heights ranging from three to twenty feet off the ground. Again these nests are often in close proximity to a water source such as a stream.

== Distribution and habitat ==
Polistes erythrocephalus is found in Central and South America. Although this species is most concentrated in Costa Rica and Panama, it has also been observed in Nicaragua, Venezuela, Colombia, Ecuador, Peru, Bolivia, and Southern Brazil. In Costa Rica, P. erythrocephalus nests are specifically highly concentrated in Finca Taboga and on the Osa Peninsula. In these countries P. erythrocephalus build nests in protected yet open areas both among humans and in the wild.

== Life cycle ==
The average P. erythrocephalus life cycle is 110 days with an observed range of 91–131 days. P. erythrocephalus go through the common Polistes maturation phases of eggs, larva, pupa, and adult. The egg stage is typically 14 days, the larva stage 29, the pupa stage is about 22 and the adult stage continues until death, which is on average 45 days.

== Colony cycle ==
Polistes erythrocephalus colony cycle follows that of many other Polistes species in that it involves four separate phases. the founding phase, the worker phase, the reproductive phase, and the intermediate phase. The length of a colony cycle for P. erythrocephalus varies depending on if the particular group is located in a tropical or more temperate region. The colony cycle of tropical P. erythrocephalus is six to seven months long. This is one to three months longer than the typical colony cycle of P. erythrocephalus in more temperate areas. This varying colony dissolution time represents an optimization of the tradeoffs of predation before reproduction and the number of reproductives produced should the colony continue to survive.

=== The founding phase ===
The founding phase begins in the spring and involves individual reproductive females (called foundresses) building new nests. While one female founds the nest she is often joined by other foundresses several days later. In field studies, P. erythrocephalus were observed to have an average of 4.9 foundresses with a range of 1 to 10. If a foundress is not joined by other females within two weeks of starting the nest she will abandon her nest. During the founding phase the foundress composition of any given nest changes daily as foundresses move from nest to nest. In this way the foundress continues to reassess her reproductive options.

=== The worker phase ===
During the worker phase in many Polistes species adult workers and early males are eclosed (emerge as adults from pupae). As workers emerge, they begin to assume colony tasks such as nest maintenance, foraging, and larva care. A typical P. erythrocephalus nest grows to contain around 95 cells. If a colony loses its queen or if she stops ovipositing, then all construction on the nest will stop. This is because the queens are the "primary initiators." While the workers may do much of the building and maintenance, queens with mature eggs in their ovaries demonstrate cell initiation behavior and are responsible for beginning the process.

=== The reproductive phase ===
The reproductive phase lasts from the emergence of the first reproductives until the colony begins to decline and new reproductives disperse to form their own nests. During this time males wait on perches near nests in order to have the opportunity to mate with a virgin foundress. In some cases males will defend their perch in order to ensure the continuation of their genes. In the reproductive phase workers provide larvae with food. This causes hierarchies among workers to emerge as more dominant individual workers forage significantly less than subordinates.

=== The intermediate phase ===
In P. erythrocephalus the termination of nest growth and start of brood decline occurs when the queen ceases laying eggs or disappears. This demonstrates that the colony cycle of P. erythrocephalus is a function of the queen's reproductive cycle. During the time between colony decline and the founding of new colonies, the initial colony begins to disperse as new reproductives search for locations to initiate their own nests. The foundresses of the colony often disappear as males accumulate in the nest. Adults often remove paper from old nests and recycle it to use for new ones.

== Behavior ==
=== Caste importance ===
As is common in many wasp species the queen of P. erythrocephalus nests has great influence over the behavior of the colony. The presence of an active reproductive queen in P. erythrocephalus is a necessity for normal colony expansion and nest growth. Under nutritional stress when an active queen is removed and a former inactive queen is substituted the brood will decline. However, under normal conditions when a queen is removed the nest can continue to grow (at a reduced rate) if there are workers present. These experiments demonstrate that the simultaneous presence of an active queen and an effective caste of workers have a huge effect on the success of the nest and colony. While it is often thought that a colony begins to decline with the cessation of the queen, this removal is often accompanied with an absence of workers. These two factors combined lead to colony decline.

=== Sex ratios ===
Polistes erythrocephalus nests of less than 50 cells contain no males. This absence confirms that only females accompany the reproductive queen (foundress) in the forming of a new nest. In nests of greater than 50 cells males begin to appear indicating that they are the progeny of the founding queen. The number of males in a nest increases as the number of cells increases until there is an equal ratio of males and females. As the number of cells in a nest increases so does the number of adults associated with the nest. While the number of females tends to increase proportionally more in smaller nests the sex ratio equals out in nests of 300 cells of more.

=== Reproductive competition ===
As in many multifoundress wasp species, P. erythrocephalus foundresses compete viciously in order to become the dominant female. These interactions include chasing, biting, lunging, "sting threats," and aggressive mounting. Fights between individuals can sometimes even be fatal. These competitions lead to only one reproductively dominant female while the rest become subordinates. Once reproductive dominance is achieved then that female asserts great control over the behavior of the nest.

== Feeding ==
=== Diet ===
P. erythrocephalus are predatory wasps and feed on a wide variety of larvae. A colony's predatory capacity depends on the number of their own larvae present in their nest rather than the number of adults present. They are known to prey upon hornworm larvae and were observed to eat an average of 0.5 hornworm larvae per day (maximum of 1.3 and a minimum of 0.08).

=== Starvation resistance ===
The starvation resistance of P. erythrocephalus was tested on both adults and larvae. Adults P. erythrocephalus demonstrated average resistance and died in two to three days when cut off from food and water. The larvae of P. erythrocephalus however proved to be extremely starvation resistant. In one nest six larvae were found alive after 26 days without any food or water. After this time one of the larvae was minced and fed to the remaining larvae which ate it readily. This demonstrates that the larvae will behave cannibalistically when necessary.

== Interactions with other species ==
=== Predators, parasites and symbionts ===
One of the most devastating predators of P. erythrocephalus are army ants such as Eciton burchellii. These ants attack wasp nests and consume the larva and pupa, often destroying the nest in the process. P. erythrocephalus has not been observed to have any ability to defend their nests from such predators. However, they will attack and sting larger slow moving threats such as humans if they get within 1–2 meters of a nest.

The most common symbiont found in P. erythrocephalus nests is Pachysomoides stupida, a type of parasitic ichneumon. Papery cocoons of Pachysomoides stupida are found in many P. erythrocephalus nests while adults are seldom found. Other parasites of P. erthrocephalus include some species of Oxysarcodexia or flesh flies and Brachymeria conica (Brachymeria is a parasitic wasp genus). Both these species parasitize the larva and pupa of P. erythacephalus. Additionally, some Xenon species parasitize P. erythrocephalus adults, acting as permanent entomophagous endoparasites by dwelling in the abdomen.

Microlepidoptera (types of smaller moths) larvae have been observed to feed on the excretory waste of wasp larvae.

=== Honeydew collection ===
Polistes eythrocephalus is not commonly observed to tend or collect honeydew from aetalionids (treehoppers) or any other insect species. Honeydew is a good source of carbohydrates, composed of a mixture of oligosaccharides. This mixture provides those that eat it with an energy source higher than that of floral nectar. However, in one study done in Peru researchers observed a single female P. erythrocephalus among an aggregation of Aetalion reticulatum (treehoppers). The female P. erythrocephalus stood among or below the treehoppers and touched them with her antennae. Though they did not directly feed her, the honeydew accumulated below where the A. reticulatum were standing. P. erythrocephalus then collected the honeydew from the branch. This research provides the first bit of evidence that P. erythrocephalus may tend to aetalionids within its range.

=== Recycling nests ===
A number of species take advantage of abandoned nests. An unidentified species of Trypoxylon (a mud-daubing sphecid) uses the cells in order to raise its own brood. Moths of family Phycitidae use the cells as a safe place to form a cocoon. Spiders of families such as Salticidae, Linyphiidae, Oonopidae, and Scytodidae have been observed to use the nests for brooding and resting webs.

== Human importance ==
As predatory wasps P. erythrocephalus is a natural pest controller. They have long been considered responsible for feeding on and thus controlling the population of leaf-eating worms in tobacco fields in South America. They were especially important to the large plantations of the Colombian Tobacco Company (la Compañia Colombiana de Tabaco) from 1932-1936.

In experiments P. erythrocephalus were introduced to Bacillus thuringiensis which is a bacterium with insecticidal properties. Bacillus thuringiensis however proved harmless to P. erythrocephalus as nest concentrations and working conditions remained completely unchanged.
