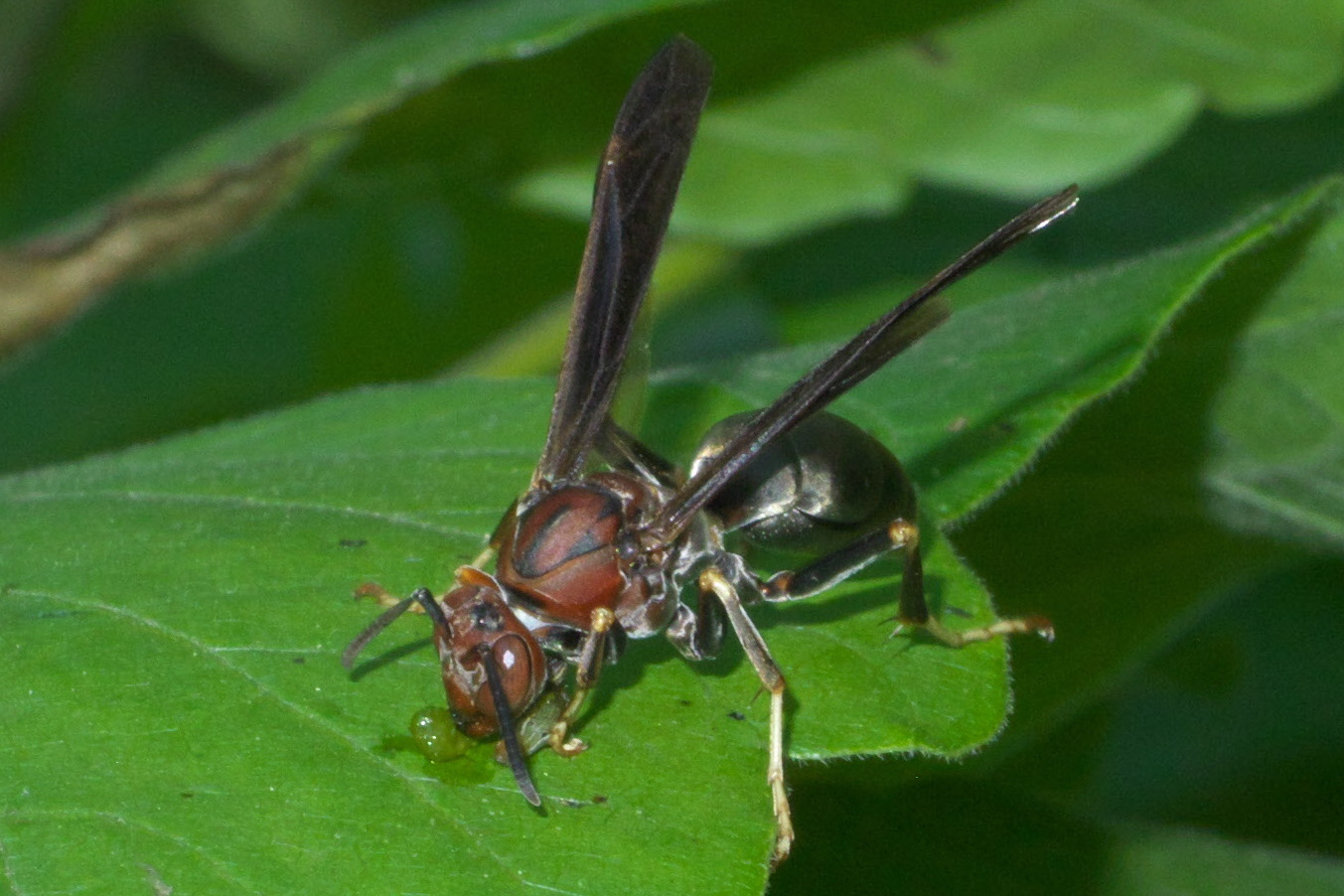

Scientific classification
- Kingdom: Animalia
- Phylum: Arthropoda
- Clade: Pancrustacea
- Class: Insecta
- Order: Hymenoptera
- Family: Vespidae
- Subfamily: Polistinae
- Tribe: Polistini
- Genus: Polistes
- Species: P. metricus

Binomial name
- Polistes metricus Say, 1831

= Polistes metricus =

Metric paper wasp

Species of wasp

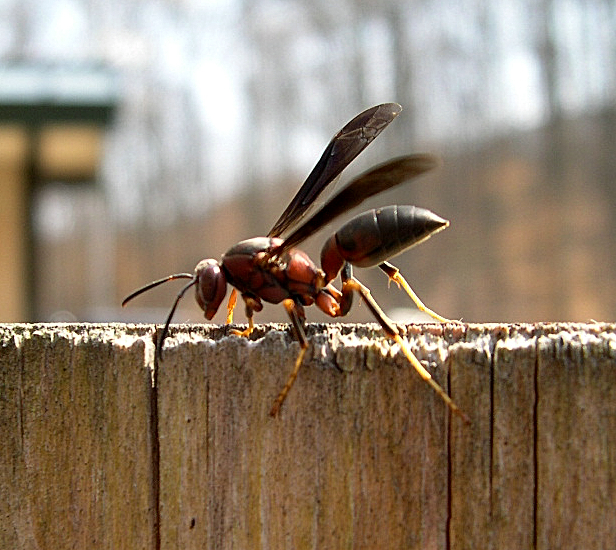
P. metricus

Polistes metricus (metric paper wasp or metricus paper wasp) is a wasp native to North America. In the United States, it ranges throughout the southern Midwest, the South, and as far northeast as New York, but has recently been spotted in southwest Ontario. A single female specimen has also been reported from Dryden, Maine. P. metricus is dark colored, with yellow tarsi and black tibia. Nests of P. metricus can be found attached to the sides of buildings, trees, and shrubbery.

Like other Polistes species, P. metricus has evolved eusociality and demonstrates behaviors including nestmate discrimination and local mate competition. Like other hymenopterans, P. metricus has a haplodiploid genetic system. Nests of P. metricus have distinct characteristics like the ability to share nests with other Polistes species and reuse nests for multiple seasons. Another distinction is that P. metricus foragers take off from their nests in different directions depending on how long their trip will be. For short flights, they exit the nest flying horizontally, while for long flights, they exit the nest flying straight up to a high altitude before pursuing their direction.

P. metricus prefers to use soft-bodied prey, especially caterpillars, to feed its larvae.

== Taxonomy ==
This species was described by Thomas Say in 1831. Rau referred to this species as Polistes pallipes or P. fuscatus pallipes in a number of his publications. However, references to P. metricus as either P. pallipes or P. fuscatus pallipes are due to confusion with a dark morph of P. fuscatus, so the name P. pallipes is rather retained as a synonym of P. fuscatus and not of P. metricus.

P. metricus is found to be most closely related to P. carolina. The most recent phylogenetic analysis shows that both share a common ancestor with P. bellicosus.

== Description and identification ==
P. metricus has a dark ferruginous (rusty) color with black markings on its thorax and a mostly black abdomen. Its tibia is black, and the tarsi are yellow. A black spot, separate from the antennae, contains the three ocelli. Females bear six abdominal segments, while males bear seven. Swelled parts of the abdomen of this species are a key defining element.

In the female, extensive rust-red coloration occurs on her head and mesosoma. Female P. metricus yellow markings are very limited in area. The mesosoma has a large spread of red color, and the metasoma shows black coloration. P. metricus also has an especially marked outward bend in sternum 2; however, this is often a very subtle characteristic. In the male, the red coloring takes up less area, but black coloration takes up more area. The male has more yellow markings than the female and a yellow color on his entire face and the pronotal carina. The yellow coloration on the legs of the male is highly variable in this species.

The smallest of the larvae can be told apart from eggs by noticing the darker anterior end of larvae. In the nests of P. metricus, cells that are capped are most likely cells that contain pupae. After pupae emerge from their cocoons, they leave behind evidence of their metamorphosis in the form of cocoon shavings.

== Distribution and habitat ==
The distribution of P. metricus is largely limited to North America. P. metricus has been spotted in the far southwestern reaches of Ontario, Canada. In the eastern United States, one female was seen in Dryden, Maine and recorded by the Canadian Nursery Certification Institute for pest control. This was a novel sighting for Maine, and probably indicated the beginnings of the spread of P. metricus into Maine. Other states where P. metricus is known to be located are on the east coast of the US, including New York, Pennsylvania, and the area from the southern part of Michigan all the way south to Florida; and the area westward to Nebraska, Kansas, Oklahoma, and the eastern part of Texas. Specifically, P. metricus has been studied in Brazos Bend State Park in Texas along with other wasp species, including Polistes bellicosus.

=== Preferred nesting sites ===
P. metricus chooses its nesting sites based on shelter from the elements, size, lighting, and sources of water. It tends to build its nests in sheds and barns and on the underside of eaves. It especially prefers large and well-lit nesting locations. Its nests are mixed with those of P. fuscatus on a regular basis, and locations where one of them is present tend to also contain the nests of the other species, in close proximity to each other. P. metricus likes to use large bodies of water, such as ponds, as sources of water. In the summer, they frequently make trips to water sources for hydration.

== Colony cycle ==
=== Overview of the colony cycle ===
The colony cycle begins in May and ends by October. The establishment of new P. metricus nests begins in early May, and this is typically performed by only one female; however, observed cases of colonies initiated by an association of foundresses have been observed. The colony slowly and gradually increases in size, and the average date for the first worker of the nest to emerge from its cocoon is in middle July. In July, the entire brood of workers emerges from its cocoons and this is also when the maximum rate of egg-laying of the year occurs. The next brood develops into males and reproductive females, and in September, these individuals also emerge from their cocoons. The survival of broods is reduced by parasitism from pyralid moths. The colony cycle typically ends by October. At this point, reproductive females leave their nests for hibernacula, locations where they spend the winter, and all males die.

=== Nest construction ===
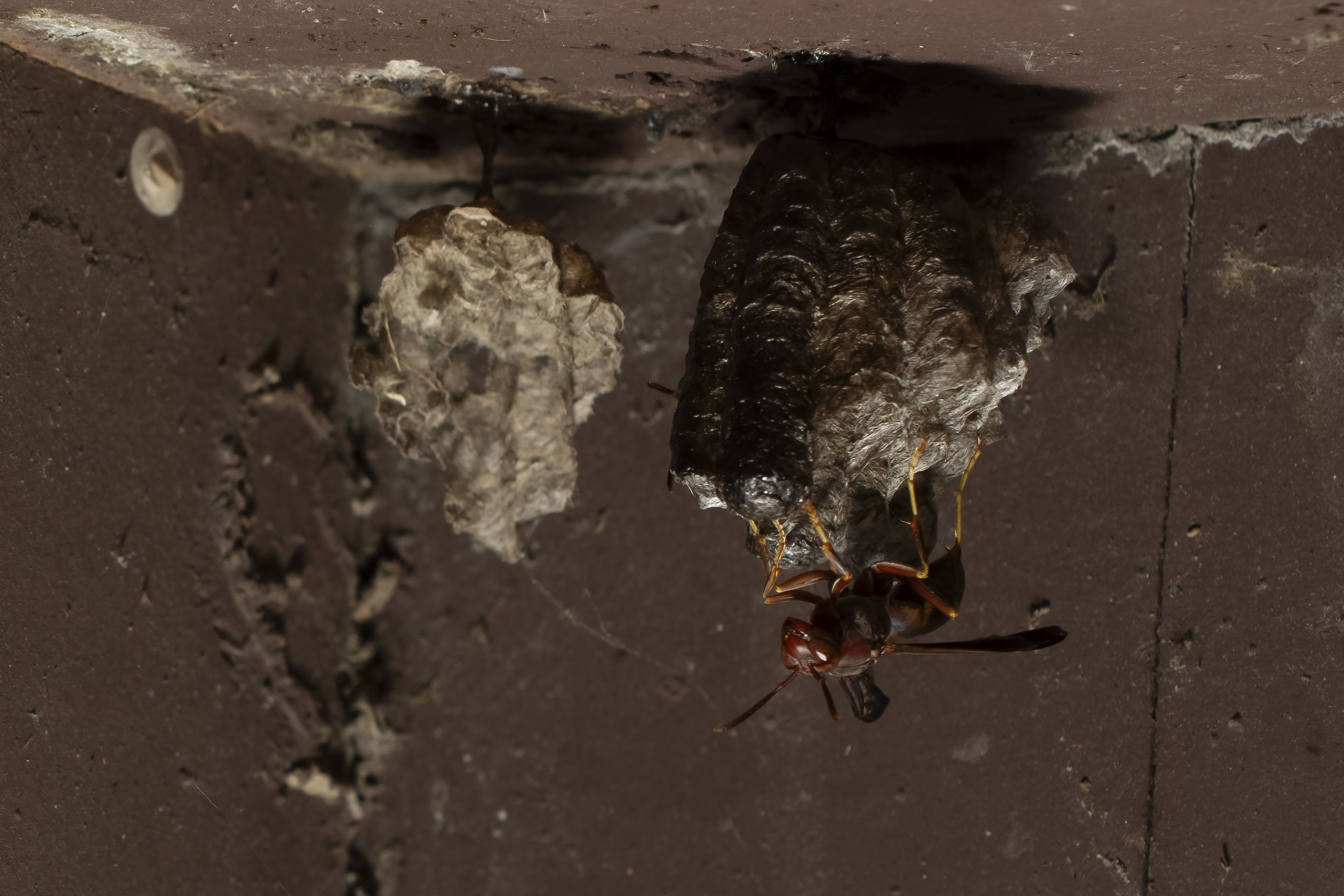
P. metricus nest in Early July.

Before July, nest construction surges ahead rapidly and the count of brood cells and the size of the nest both increase significantly. This period of speedy growth coincides with the emergence of the first brood of workers. Therefore, construction requires the input of workers. After July, the rate of cell building falls. It is rare to observe any vacant cells in the nest until late June. This is perhaps due to the queen's rate of oviposition being high enough to ensure all new cells get filled. However, due to the more rapid rate of construction between June and July, vacant cells begin to appear and become more numerous. This higher construction rate produces new cells faster than the queen's rate of oviposition. Then, in July and August, the number of vacant cells stays approximately constant. The rate of cell construction is the same as the queen's rate of oviposition. After August, vacant cell number increases significantly as the queen's oviposition slows down.

Polistes metricus has nests which grow slowly as the solitary founder may cannibalize eggs.

=== Egg production ===
The rate of egg production fluctuates throughout the colony cycle. In May, the median egg count is greater than in early June. The yearly maximum point for the egg count occurs in July; egg production then decreases steadily to zero by September. Once the first brood of worker eggs has been laid, the queen decreases her rate of oviposition as this brood matures. Once they are mature, the queen stops laying eggs. In late June and July, the queen recommences laying eggs and her rate of oviposition increases once more. If the queen is killed, removed, or dies, workers can take over the responsibility of oviposition. In fact, 22% of an emerging brood comes from eggs that were not laid by the initial queen. Surprisingly, the final period of decreasing oviposition rate is not due to old age or mortality of the queen. It is actually due to ovarian diapause that occurs throughout the entire female population of the colony.

=== Larvae and pupae populations ===
Two peaks occur in the number of larvae present in the colony. The first peak occurs in early June, coming right after the peak egg count. The second, highest peak of the larval population happens in July at exactly the same time as the highest peak in the egg count. This is probably so closely matching because eggs hatch into larvae very quickly in July, when the temperature is high. The median count of larvae decreases slightly in August and then rapidly decreases to nothing (zero) in September. The speedy fall in larval population happens because larvae pupate, and late in the season there is increased parasitism of larvae and brood destruction wrought by the adult wasps. In early June, the first pupae appear. Compared to eggs and larvae, the pupal population seems to only have one maximum. The pupal instar has a duration of 18–26 days for P. metricus.

=== Adult female and male population ===
In the beginning of the nesting season, the adult population typically contains only one adult female, the reproductive foundress. Cooperative co-founding of nests was once considered to be rare for P. metricus, but it now appears that this is becoming more common. Like eggs and larvae, the adult wasp population of P. metricus has two maxima. The first peak occurs in July and corresponds to the emergence of the first brood of workers. These workers used to be pupae in late June, and were also the first peaks of the eggs and larvae. The year's maximum count of adult females and males is in September. This is the last brood of adults and the females in this group become the next season's foundresses and overwinter in hibernacula.

== Foraging flights ==
P. metricus has a very distinctive foraging behavior compared to other wasps. Adults search for prey in low-level vegetation, shrubs, and trees. When they embark on long flights, they tend to have trees as their destination. Their pattern of flight when leaving the nest reflects the nature of their journey, as if they already know in advance the distance that their flight will take. When they wish to fly short distances, they exit the nest with a horizontal trajectory, just above the upper edges of the vegetation, and usually between 1.0 and 1.5 m above the ground level. When their flight involves greater distances, they leave the nest, flying 3 to 4 m above the ground when flight distance is about 10–15 m. Extremely long flights greater than about 100 m involve the wasp flying at high altitude, measured at 17 m, and these wasps make their climb very quickly upon taking off from the nest.

In the summer, reproductive females (gynes) fly significantly shorter distances to forage than do their worker counterparts. When a P. metricus wasp locates prey, she typically will return to the same location and search the same sites at the location on future foraging trips. This is probably because predation by P. metricus is not sufficient to dramatically reduce the prey population at the site. Compared to other paper wasps, P. metricus tends to forage over longer distances. This may be due to less tolerance of P. metricus for prey scarcity, or that when prey is scarce, P. metricus is inefficient at capturing prey. On a longer flight, once an abundant source of prey is detected, P. metricus can efficiently forage for the long-distance prey. Longer flights are facilitated by the greater average size of P. metricus compared to other paper wasp species.

== Malaxation ==
Malaxation is an act performed by an adult wasp that involves grabbing a prey insect or piece of an insect, then chewing and crushing it with the mandibles (typically at the same time inverting it and spinning it with the forelegs) until it is of a pulpy consistency. This final product is usually then fed directly to larvae. In P. metricus, females mix fructose into the morsel that they malaxate. During the process of malaxation, adults feed themselves from the liquid or semisolid material that they extract from the provision morsel. For most wasps, malaxating prey is rare and only occurs when not enough nectar or honeydew is in the environment. Since P. metricus has a longer lifespan than other wasps and engage in an exceptionally lengthy period of reproduction, it malaxates prey and consumes the protein for its metabolic needs. Malaxation typically takes place on the order of one to several minutes.

=== Larval provisioning ===
A specific routine sequence of larval provisioning behavior occurs in females of P. metricus. First, the female malaxates the morsel to be fed to the larva. During this process, solid and liquid materials from the morsel are extracted by the female and stored in her crop, from where it can be regurgitated to larvae during mouth-to-mouth trophallaxis. The female regurgitates the solid extractions from the morsel directly into the mouth of the larva. She then grooms for a period. After grooming, she resumes feeding the larva and regurgitates the liquid portions of the morsel into the larval mouth, after which she once again grooms. During regurgitation, most of the contents of the crop may be released, or the female can choose to withhold a significant portion of it. The female thereby simultaneously feeds both the larva and herself during malaxation.

=== Larval feeding by males ===
Males also can feed larvae in P. metricus. At the end of the nesting season, known as the “late season”, P. metricus females destroy both the nest and the brood, including eggs, larvae, and pupae. While late-season brood termination is normal for P. metricus, it is less common to see brood termination in the middle of the nesting season. This occurs in response to parasitic infections. Not all of the brood is destroyed. In this case, the adults females malaxate the brood that they destroy and feed it to the remaining brood. During one of these events. somewhat astonishingly, an adult male P. metricus was observed to malaxate a larva and feed a fragment of this to a surviving larva. More commonly, males of P. metricus have the general habits of malaxating pieces of food and consuming some of these pieces while discarding the rest without feeding any larvae.

== Food abundance and food scarcity ==
=== Effect of honey supplementation on individuals ===
Having excess honey has effects on individuals in a colony. If colonies are supplemented with extra honey, offspring tend to emerge from pupation earlier than usual. They also tend to have greater percentages of noncuticular body fat. When wasps have a higher noncuticular fat content, it also means that they have higher capacities for reproduction. In fact, some experiments show that increasing noncuticular body fat directly results in increased reproductive potential. While in nature, the first emerging broods of P. metricus are known to have relatively skimpy amounts of body fat, surprisingly, after honey supplementation, the first brood of workers exhibits even higher body fat than their foundresses. This suggests that in nature, colonies are typically restricted by limits on food availability during the pre-emergence phase of the nesting cycle, when only the single foundress and possible co-foundresses are available to forage for provisions for the worker brood. In general, it is common for P. metricus to store honey over the winter. The amount of honey stored and the length of time for which it is stored show variation in different years, providing evidence that honey storage depends on changing factors in the environment.

=== Effect of supplementation and starvation on the colony ===
If a colony is supplemented with extra honey, it will not affect its long-term survival, but it will change the colony's demographics. Colonies that receive extra honey tend to build more cells in their nests and produce more pupae. However, the total count of adult females does not show significant change. Honey-supplemented colonies produce more offspring overall, but more of these offspring become reproductives due to their high fat content and thus leave the nest, leaving behind a smaller number of workers than normal at the nest. The biggest changes in colony demographics occur if there are significant changes in the early and middle periods of the nesting cycle. When nourishment is systematically decreased for a brood in the larval stage, the entire colony changes as response. After two weeks of larval starvation, the foundress tends to abandon the colony, resulting in the failure and death of the colony. In response to larval starvation, most colonies cease nest construction. Fewer larvae reach the pupal stage than normal.

== Dynamics of reproduction ==
=== Male egg production ===
Whenever foundresses are present, workers are restricted from producing male eggs. The most dominant foundress in an association of co-foundresses is known as the α-foundress, who shares a portion of reproduction with the other β-foundresses. The α-foundresses takes the lion's share of reproduction, laying 78% of the colony females and 87% of the males. All foundresses are known to mate with males at least twice in their lifetimes, and they use the sperm from these two males in a 9:1 ratio with the majority of fertilizations provided by one male's set of sperm. If all of a nest's foundresses are dead or eliminated, two workers take up the responsibility of laying male eggs. One of these two workers is dominant over the other and lays 19 times more male eggs. No parental care is necessary for pupae, and pupae develop into adults on their own. In P. metricus, inbreeding is exceedingly rare. Associations of co-foundresses are generally composed of half or full sisters that came from the same natal nest the previous season.

=== Foundress mortality ===
Once the first brood of workers emerges from the nest, foundresses stop leaving the nest. There is a two-day refractory period in which no work is done, and then the workers take over the responsibility of foraging for the nest. From this point forward, foundress mortality is zero for the rest of the egg-laying season. However, if one starts to observe that only males are emerging from the nest, it can be assumed that all the foundresses of the colony have died approximately 47 days earlier. These males would not have been produced by the foundresses, but instead by their worker daughters, who have since taken over egg-laying and produce only male eggs. On the condition that the foundresses die after the first brood of workers has already become pupae, then there is still a good chance that the colony will survive, since pupae do not require any adult maintenance or feeding and will develop on their own. If the foundresses die before pupation of any workers, then the colony is doomed to failure because the brood will die of starvation. In the event of foundress mortality, the overall productivity of the nest declines, most likely because of the loss of parental care from the foundresses before worker care begins. In general, foundress mortality tends to be great in the period between nest initiation and the emergence of the first brood of workers. The death of any one foundress results in the proportional increase in the contribution of the other foundresses to the colony's reproduction.

== Ecology ==
=== Predators ===
Polistes metricus is subject to predation by birds, spiders, ants, and deer mice. Birds attack the P. metricus nest by puncturing its lateral margin and removing the pupae and larger larvae.

=== Prey ===
Polistes wasps including P. metricus prey on Lepidopteran larvae (i.e. caterpillars) most frequently. They are considered generalist predators. Polistes also eat other insects. P. metricus prefers to prey upon soft-bodied prey such as caterpillars and the larvae of tenthredinids and chrysomelids. Manipulation by parental feedings has been hypothesized to play a role in the development of larvae. The proponents of the hypothesis argue that the well fed larvae grow to be reproductive adults. However, it was found that parent manipulation of the brood is not done in Polistes metricus.

=== Parasites ===
Parasitoids and parasites of Polistes metricus tend to affect the colony at different stages in their development. It has been shown that C. pegasalis is able to infect a colony at any stage except the egg stage. C. pegasalis prefers to infect colonies that have larvae and pupae. X. peckii is similar because it prefers to parasitize larvae and pupae. In contrast, X. peckii can infect any stage of development. Infestations of Xenos parasites happen frequently in Georgia.

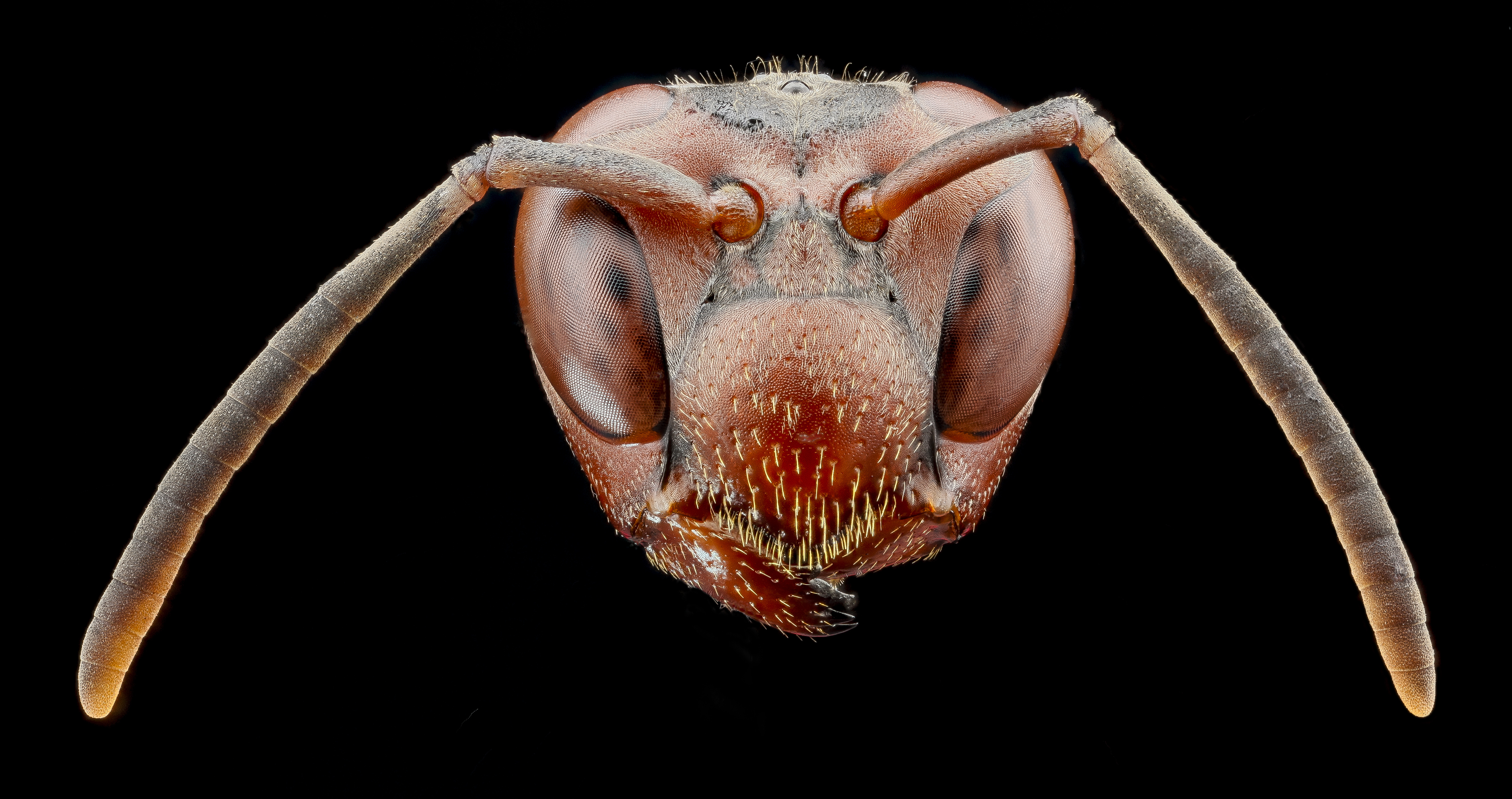
Polistes metricus head structure

The nests of this wasp are parasitised by the parasitoid caterpillars of the pyralid moth Chalcoela iphitalis which feed on the wasp larvae and pupas at night, spinning their cocoons in empty cells.

== Behavior ==
=== Eusociality ===
In order to differentiate female workers from female reproductive wasps in Polistes metricus, behavior must be studied since they are morphologically similar. Female reproductives are referred to as queens or foundresses. The reproductive queens have more developed ovaries compared to the workers. Consequently, female Polistes have the ability to be reproductive depending on the social and physical environment they occupy. Polistes metricus is considered to be a eusocial organism, characterized by sterile castes, overlapping generations, and cooperative care for offspring. Polistes metricus, like Polistes dominula and Polistes annularis, differs from many other advanced eusocial insects in that the distinction between reproductive females and non-reproductive females is subtle.

=== Deviation from 1:1 sex ratio ===
Polistes metricus has been shown to demonstrate a deviation from Fisher's prediction of a 1:1 male to female sex ratio. Despite the equal parental investment in the sexes, the average frequency for females in Polistes metricus is approximately .55. In most species that deviate from a 1:1 sex ratio, there is a degree of sexual dimorphism, with the more common sex being smaller. Polistes metricus follows this trend, with females being smaller than males on average.

=== Haplodiploidy ===
Like other insects of the order Hymenoptera, Polistes metricus has a haplodiploid genetic system. When a queen's eggs are fertilized, they produce diploid daughters; unfertilized eggs produce haploid male offspring. Consequently, in colonies with a monogamous queen, females are more closely related to their sisters than to their brothers, mothers, or future offspring. It has been argued that, due to the three-quarter relatedness between haplodiploid sisters, there exists a conflict between the queen and her female offspring. Robert A. Metcalf argues that data on the skewed sex ratios does not prove or disprove the hypothesis of parent-offspring conflict over male production and parental investment. Metcalf's study shows that the foundresses control the production of males by restricting sperm availability to workers.

The importance of haplodiploidy in terms of the evolution of eusociality was brought into question using a phylogenetic study of Polistes by Pickett et al. The paper argues that through a phylogenetic test they found that there is little support for the idea the haplodiploidy lead to early social evolution in the genus Polistes.

=== Local mate competition ===
In a population that has a female biased sex ratio, according to W. D. Hamilton, there could be Local Mate Competition, or LMC. Local Mate Competition occurs in female biased populations because brothers must compete with each other for mates. These mates might be their sisters; therefore, inbreeding should be higher in these populations. Robert A. Metcalf's study of inbreeding in both Polistes metricus and P. variatus using phenotypic differences found that there were no signs of inbreeding in either population. According to Metcalf's research, the lack of inbreeding in Polistes metricus makes it unlikely that LMC occurs. Additionally, there has been research that shows that some populations produce only male reproductives. This occurs when the queen dies and the workers lay eggs. The female workers are not fertilized so they produce males who are haploid.

== Effects of resources ==
=== Local resource enhancement, size, and reproductive ability ===
Food supplementation and access to food does not affect the number or the sizes of worker offspring. This could suggest that there is not the adaptive advantage to make larger workers. Stabilizing selection is present to make a fixed number of workers regardless of nest size or food availability. The selection shifts toward the production of more sexual females than larger males. The colonies that are supplemented with food also produced more reproductive females than larger reproductive females which suggests that female sexual production in resource limited conditions is very expensive. Males however, are slightly larger on average which could mean that the number of males produced is not as critical as male size. It has been proposed that larger males helps the colony by attacking foreign males, and defending nest territory.

Nutrient level of certain macro and micronutrients varies throughout the life history of the organism. There are few large differences in nutrient levels between workers and gynes; however, gynes process lipids differently by retaining them. On the other hand, the differences in nutrient levels in reproductive larvae and non-reproductive larvae are strong. Additionally, nutrient levels does not change throughout the lifetime of both male and females Polistes metricus. Based on these observations, the nutrient level at the larval stage tends to correlate with the reproductive ability of the larvae as it develops.

Increased food resources have also been shown to lead to an increase in the production of gynes at the expense of worker production.

== Nest characteristics ==
=== Nest sharing and nest reutilization ===
In certain locations across the United States, such as eastern Kansas, individual foundresses of Polistes metricus can maintain more than one nest or even share a nest with another foundress. In cases where multiple nests are maintained by a single foundress, males are not produced. This phenomenon is due in part to the extensive parasitism found in eastern Kansas. Chalcoela iphitalis is a parasitic moth that is commonly found in the nests of Polistes metricus. It is not known why Polistes metricus has evolved this behavior. It has been proposed that the behaviors are able to limit the chance of reproductive failure for any one foundress.

In some situations, it has been observed that a nest is shared between two species of Polistes. One case is the sharing of a nest by Polistes metricus and Polistes fuscatus. The different species of wasps were seen to coexist without conflict. The evolutionary significance of joint nesting is unclear. Proposed hypotheses include the fact that it might represent the beginning stages of interspecific mutualism or exploitation.

Nest reuse has been observed in Polistes metricus species. It is common for a foundress to use the nest multiple times within a reproductive season. However, it is very unlikely for foundresses of any species to return to a nest in a subsequent season.

=== Nest founding ===
Adult female Polistes use their salivary enzymes to soften wood or paper products to form a nest pedicel. The adult female foundress or foundresses will then begin to build the nest cells. They will also lay eggs. In colonies with multiple foundresses, one will become dominant and lay the most eggs. Once the first worker develops, the nest moves from the founding phase into the worker phase. Following the worker phase is the reproductive stage, where the dominant foundress loosens her control over the other colony members and the workers lay sterile male eggs. The period in between the reproductive phase and the founding phase of the next season is the intermediate phase. Adult female gynes and adult males leave the nest to mate.

=== Nestmate discrimination ===
It has been suggested that Polistes metricus females discriminate between nestmates and non-nestmates using genetically determined cues regarding food, nesting materials, or nest site. These genetically predetermined cues have been found in Lasioglossum zephrym, a species of bee at a similar social level. Polistes metricus gynes can detect and work with former nestmates without being inside the nest in which they were born. In situations where there is no nest, nestmates are more tolerant of each other than are nestmates in Polistes metricus. Former nestmates are often assumed to be sisters or other close relatives.

Nestmate discrimination does not occur in workers or non-reproductives, which could suggest a relationship between nestmate discrimination, nutrient availability, and the environment.

=== Multiple foundress colonies ===
In Polistes metricus, colonies with more than one queen are aptly named multiple foundress colonies. It is beneficial for a colony to have many foundresses because they can protect the nest from usurpers, parasites, and help rebuild the nest if it is destroyed. It has been shown that individuals in multiple foundress colonies spend less time at the nest compared to individuals in single foundress colonies. The dominance hierarchy in multiple foundress colonies consists of the dominant foundress at the top, and subordinate foundresses beneath her. Gynes and worker wasps make up the base of the hierarchy. Dominant foundresses in multiple foundress colonies forage for wood, pulp, and nectar, while subordinate foundresses take long foraging trips and return with the majority of the sustenance for the colony. Foundress mortality increases after the workers emerge. Also, less dominant foundresses are often kicked out of the nest prior to the laying of eggs that will become reproductive. It is improbable that subordinate foundresses will become dominant. Lastly, if a subordinate foundress lays eggs, the dominant foundress will often consume them. Based on the subordinate foundresses status in a multiple foundress colony, it may appear to be better for her to create a new colony of her own. However, creating a new colony is more difficult to do than waiting to displace the queen. It has also been proposed that natural selection favors foundresses that have offspring that are a mixture of dominant foundresses and workers.

== Conservation ==
The IUCN has not evaluated this species' conservation status.
