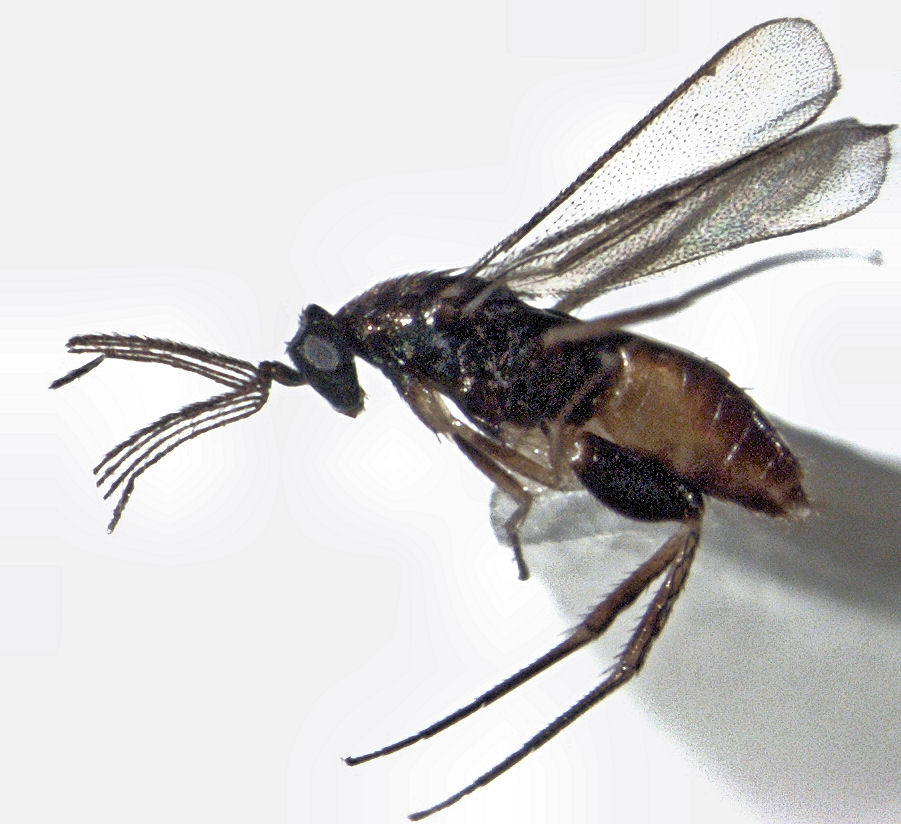
- Elasmus male

Scientific classification
- Kingdom: Animalia
- Phylum: Arthropoda
- Clade: Pancrustacea
- Class: Insecta
- Order: Hymenoptera
- Family: Eulophidae
- Subfamily: Eulophinae
- Genus: Elasmus; Westwood, 1833

Type species
- Elasmus flabellatus (Fonscolombe, 1832)

Species
- >210 species

Synonyms
- Aneure Nees, 1834; Heptacondyla Rondani, 1877; Cyclopleura Cameron, 1913; Austelasmus Riek, 1967

= Elasmus =

Genus of wasps

The genus Elasmus is a member of the hymenopteran subfamily Eulophinae (formerly classified as a separate family, Elasmidae), and contains over 200 species worldwide. They are mostly parasitoids or hyperparasitoids of lepidopteran larvae, though several species are parasitoids of Polistes paper wasp larvae.
