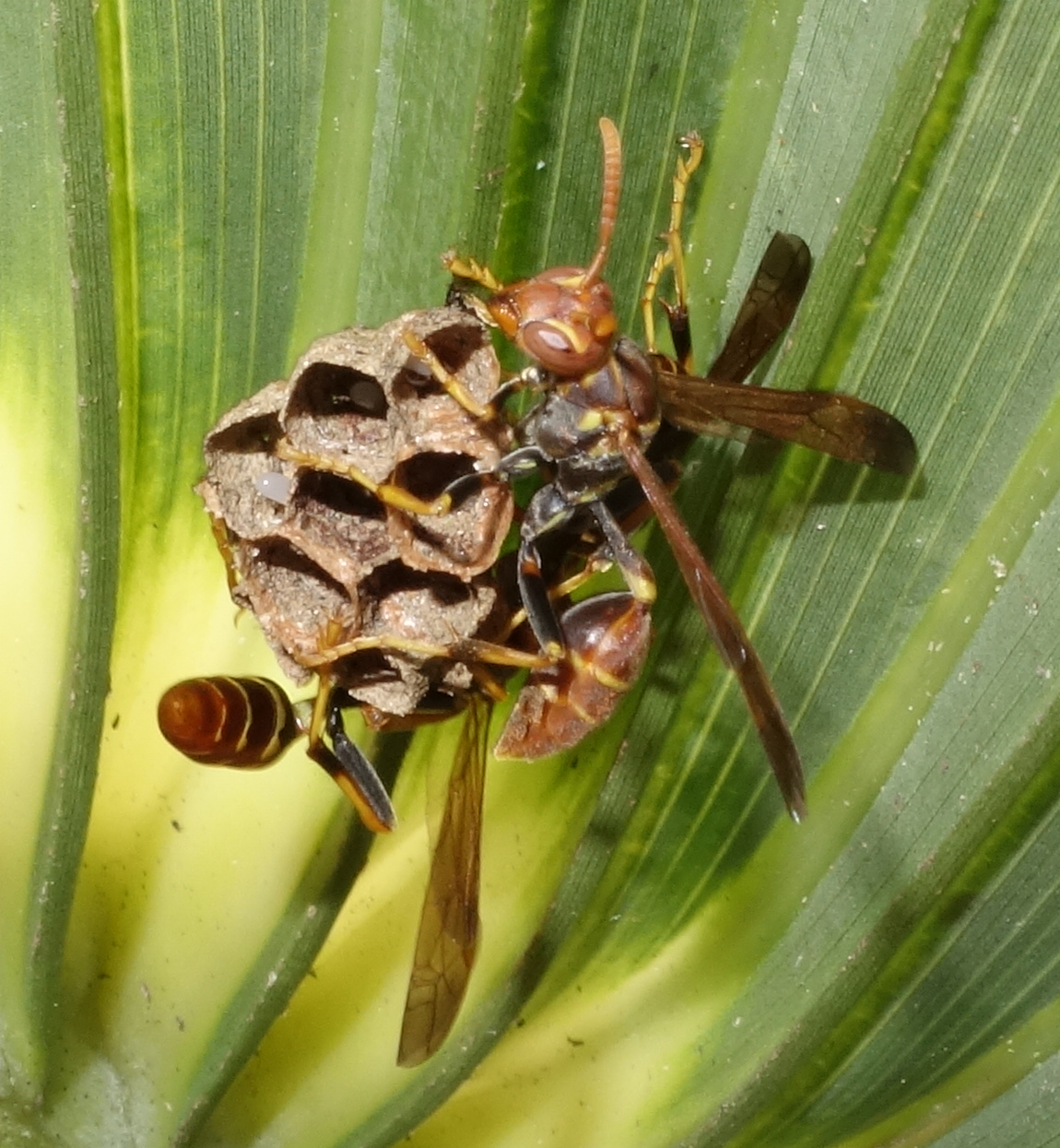
- Mischocyttarus mexicanus cubicola nest on a palm in Florida

Scientific classification
- Domain: Eukaryota
- Kingdom: Animalia
- Phylum: Arthropoda
- Class: Insecta
- Order: Hymenoptera
- Family: Vespidae
- Subfamily: Polistinae
- Genus: Mischocyttarus
- Species: M. mexicanus
- Subspecies: M. m. cubicola

Trinomial name
- Mischocyttarus mexicanus cubicola Richards, 1978

= Mischocyttarus mexicanus cubicola =

Subspecies of wasp

Mischocyttarus mexicanus cubicola is a neotropical subspecies of paper wasp found in the New World. It is a social wasp that demonstrates two different types of nesting strategies, depending upon context. This context-dependent trait makes Mischocyttarus mexicanus cubicola a good model to study social biology within social wasps. In detail, this trait allows for the females of this species to form nests both individually and as co-founders with other females within the same colony. This subspecies is also known to exhibit cannibalism, with M. m. cubicola queens feeding on their own larvae for nourishment when unaided by workers.

== Taxonomy and phylogeny ==
Mischocyttarus mexicanus cubicola is part of the family Vespidae, which classifies the species as a wasp. Wasps, including M. m. cubicola are classified under the order of Hymenoptera, making ants, bees, and sawflies, which fall under the same order, relatives of wasps. It then falls under the subfamily Polistinae, which is home to paper wasps specifically. The genus of this species, Mischocyttarus, is the largest social wasp genus with 189 species and 15 subspecies. Mischocyttarus mexicanus cubicola is one of two subspecies in the species mexicanus, the other subspecies being Mischocyttarus mexicanus mexicanus.

== Description and identification ==
In general, the genus Mischocyttarus can be identified by the asymmetrical internal and external lobes of the thetarsal segments in adults. Similarly, mature Mischocyttarus larvae are identified by appendix-like projections extending forward from the abdominal sternum. M. m. cubicola is similar to other species such as M. flavitarsis and M. angulatus as they all have a sharp secondary margin on their pronotum, the dorsal surface of the prothorax. Males are seen to have short, thick antennae and females have a head plate, called a clypeus, with a flattened apex. The M. mexicanus species is usually orange-yellow in color, and the subspecies cubicola has yellow stripes on the mid tibia and hind tibia base. The metasoma of this subspecies is reddish in color with yellow bands.

== Distribution and habitat ==
Mischocyttarus mexicanus cubicola is found to habit in primarily neotropical and temperate areas. M. m. cubicola nests have been found in the US states of Florida, Alabama, Georgia and South Carolina. Later, the subspecies was found to extend into Texas as well, as females were spotted in Bellaire, Houston. This subspecies has also been found in other countries as well, such as Cuba, the Bahamas, and Puerto Rico. In the southernmost part of its range, Mischocyttarus mexicanus cubicola nests through the year, whereas in the more temperate regions, it hibernates during the winter season. This species is common, as it belong to the genus Mischocyttarus, which is the largest social wasp genus with 189 species and 15 subspecies.

== Colony cycle ==
The nests of Mischocyttarus mexicanus cubicola can be founded by anywhere from one to twenty females. Even through there is an early and late period for nests, the nests can be initiated during any part of the year. The founders of new nests are usually born at the same time and the nests they found are not too far from their natal nest site. Each nest can have one or more queens and in addition there is a range of female sexual development. With that said, most females have the capability of becoming a queen, as most are reproductively viable. These nests have combs of open cells that consist of paper that attached to leaves by a stem. The life cycle of the nest can be divided into two stages: pre-daughter and post-daughter stages, also known as pre-eclosion and post-eclosion nests. The lifetime of a nest is estimated to be around eight months, although many nest disintegrate before this.

== Communication ==
Communication via biting is frequently seen to occur between nestmates of Mischocyttarus mexicanus cubicola. The foragers of pleometrotic nests were found to be the least aggressive individuals of a given colony. It has also been observed that the females with the least developed ovaries were the ones that did the most foraging in a given colony. In addition, it has been hypothesized that as M. mexicanus cubicola individuals age, they accumulate a specific odor, which aligns with the observation that older female wasps are usually rejected from foreign nests. It has also been found that male individuals of this species have exocrine gland cells in their gastral sternites, which supports the idea the M. m. cubicola uses chemicals for communication such as nest-mate recognition and pheromone signaling.

== Nesting tactics ==
There are two stable nesting strategies found within this subspecies: haplometrosis and pleometrosis. Haplometrosis is the single-foundress nesting strategy and pleometrosis is the strategy that involves multiple cofoundresses. Both tactics are found to be stable in this species because they are context-dependent traits; each strategy is favorable in certain conditions. This trait is also suggested to be plastic, as an adult female can switch nesting tactics as an adult depending on the context. Haplometrosis is found most commonly in the winter and spring, whereas pleometrosis is found frequently in the fall. Haplometrotic nests are victim to greater mortality, as eighty percent of haplometrotic nests fail within twenty days. It has been thought that larger females are more likely to be single foundresses in the spring and cofoundresses in the summer. In addition, when the number of potential habitats in a give area is experimentally decreased, the nests are more likely to be constructed by pleometrosis and the converse has also been found to exist as well.

== Nest usurpation ==
When a queen is removed from a nest, it has been observed over the course of a week that the eggs and larvae gradually disappear. During this time, no new cells are constructed in the nest and at the end of this time period, a subordinate wasp may begin the process of becoming the new queen by laying eggs. It has also been noted that non-residents are accepted into a nest when the nest is new and the non-resident wasp is young. With that said, older nests tend to disallow non-residents and older wasps are usually not allowed to join colonies. It has also been hypothesized that this species might be a brood parasite, cannibalizing on eggs of foreign nests and placing their own eggs in an empty cell of the foreign nest. These observations suggest that the M. mexicanus species reject foreign wasps based on the risk of nest usurpation.

== Social structure ==
Females within M. mexicanus cubicola colonies are at different levels of ovary development and although there are usually one or more queens in a given colony, many females are reproductive viable within the colony. Females are highly variable after a nest is founded, as one may become the queen (the primary reproductive female) while the others become subordinates. Consequently, due to the high variability in females, nest switching is common where if a queen is removed, a resident may quickly replace her over the course of a week. Even though females within a colony are of quite low levels of relatedness, some nests are pleometrotic perhaps due to reduced development times, larger colony sizes, and reduced mortality rates in these cofoundress nests.

== Lobe erection ==
Mischocyytarus larvae can be distinguished from other wasps by having a one-, two-, or three-pointed lobe on the ventral surface of the first abdominal segment. It has been hypothesized that these abdominal lobes play a role in feeding, with similar morphology to the trophthyllax of pseudomyrmecine ant larvae. Later, it was also observed in a relative, M. drewseni, that the lobes did not play a role in feeding, but rather were involved in responding to saliva solicitation of a workers by either producing a droplet or secretion or if it did not have any secretion to yield, by going back into the cell and pulling its abdominal lobes over its head. Therefore, it has also been suggested that these lobes are of adaptive value to the behavior of saliva donorism. This behavior has also been noted in both male and female larvae of Mischocyttarus mexicanus cubicola.

== Cannibalism ==
Intercolonial cannibalism is also found within the nests of the subspecies Mischocyttarus mexicanus cubicola, with foreign conspecific females having the ability to intrude on a nest once every five hours. It has been thought that conspecifics may pose the greatest threat to females rearing their young in nests. Nest usurpation and stealing brood from those nests to feed young select for ground nest founding in these paper wasps. The cannibalism of this species seems to show that when the queen is unaided by workers, she resorts to nourishing herself by feeding on her brood and their saliva rather than by foraging.

== Diet ==
Mischocyttarus mexicanus cubicola has been observed to forage for both arthropod and nectar-based foods. In addition to queens exhibiting cannibalism by feeding on their own larvae, it has been hypothesized that this species preys on arthropod larvae as well. Additionally, females have been seen to forage on palmetto and Lyonia flowers. Males also have been found on flowers and frequently jump onto other M. m. cubicola wasps that are foraging the same flowers, which is hypothesized to be related to mating habits of the species.

== Predators ==
Major sources of predation of Mischocyttarus mexicanus cubicola are birds such as wrens, blue jays, yellowthroats, cardinals, mockingbirds, and woodpeckers. Spiders such as Argiope aurantia and Nephila clavipes are also known to be predators of this species. Ant raids are also common to this species, even though it is rare that ants will raid a nest that hasn't already been abandoned. With that said, it is most common that a single ant will encounter a nest and be successfully deterred. Ant species such as Campanotus floridanus, Crematogaster ashmeadi, and Pheidole floridana have been observed to raid live nests and eat the wasp colony's brood.
