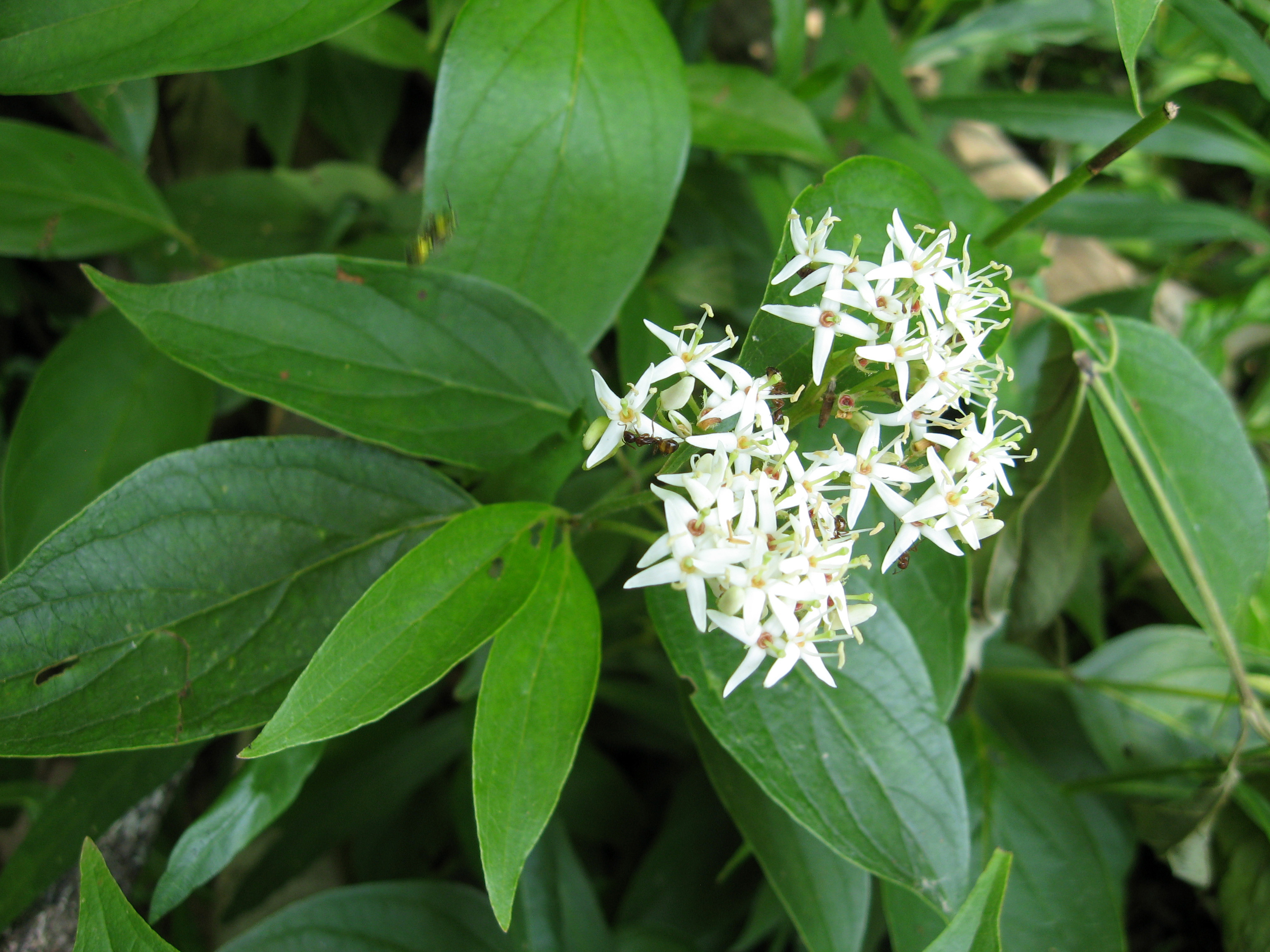

Conservation status
- Least Concern (IUCN 3.1)

- Secure (NatureServe)

Scientific classification
- Kingdom: Plantae
- Clade: Tracheophytes
- Clade: Angiosperms
- Clade: Eudicots
- Clade: Asterids
- Order: Cornales
- Family: Cornaceae
- Genus: Cornus
- Subgenus: Cornus subg. Kraniopsis
- Species: C. foemina

Binomial name
- Cornus foemina Mill.
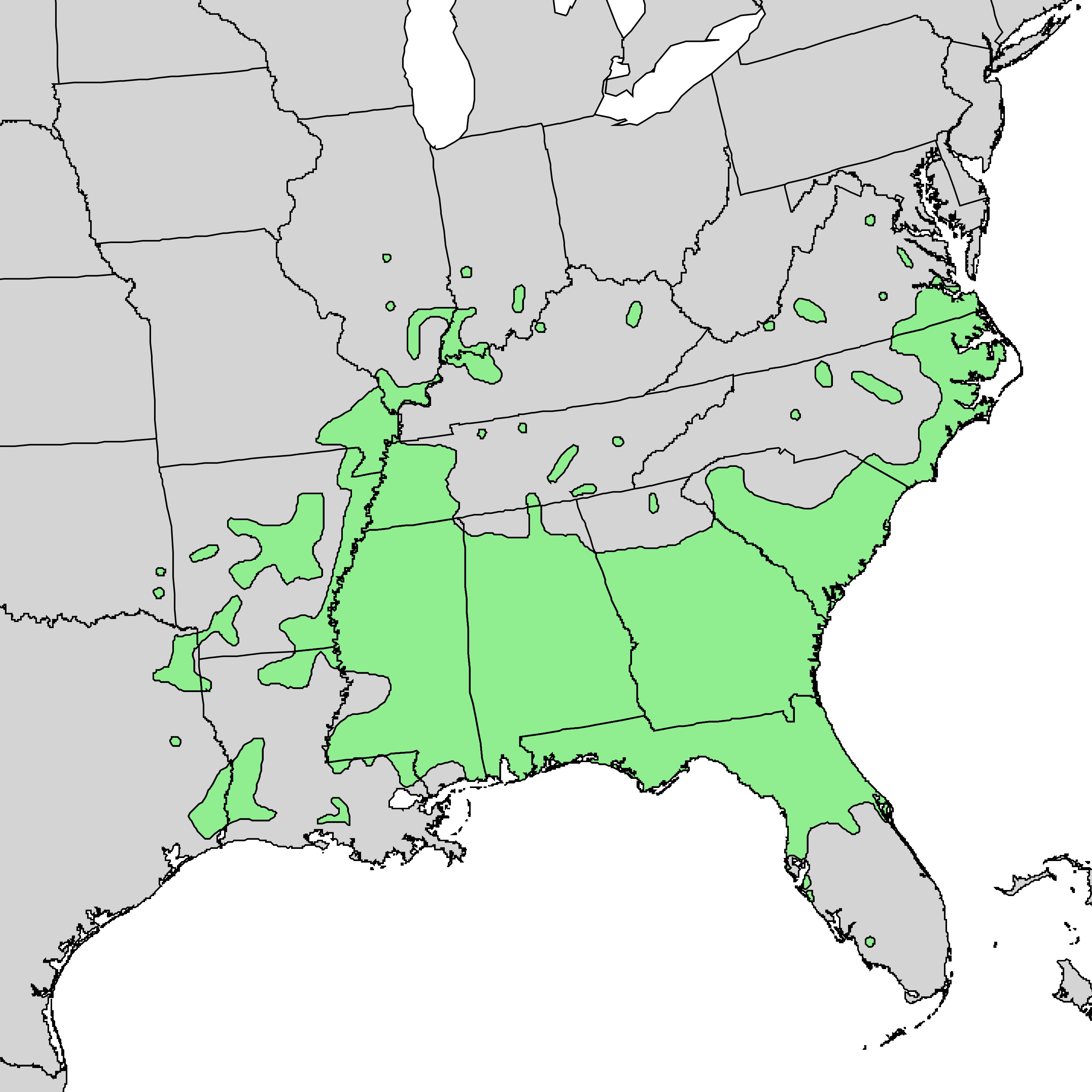
- Generalized natural range of Cornus foemina

Synonyms
- Cornus candidissima Marshall, nom. illeg.; Cornus citrifolia Lam., nom. illeg.; Cornus coerulea Meerb.; Cornus cyanocarpos J.F.Gmel., nom. illeg.; Cornus cyanocarpus J.F.Gmel., nom. illeg.; Cornus fastigiata Michx.; Cornus striata DC.; Cornus stricta Lam.; Cornus stricta L'Hér., nom. illeg.; Swida foemina (Mill.) Rydb.; Swida stricta (Lam.) Small; Thelycrania candidissima Pojark.; Thelycrania stricta (Lam.) Pojark.

= Cornus foemina =

Species of flowering plant

Cornus foemina is a species of flowering plant in the family Cornaceae known by the common names stiff dogwood and swamp dogwood. It is native to parts of the eastern and southeastern United States.

This plant is a large shrub or small tree up to 25 feet tall with trunks up to 4 inches wide. The bark is smooth or furrowed. The oppositely arranged, deciduous leaves are oval in shape with smooth edges. The inflorescence is a flat-topped cluster of white flowers. The fruit is a blue or purple drupe.

This plant grows in wetlands, often in swampy conditions. It can tolerate moderate amounts of salinity.

== Description ==
Cornus foemina is considered a large shrub to a small tree. It can grow up to 8 meters tall. The trunks of the plant grow up to 10 centimeters in diameter. The stems grow in a clustered arrangement and have bark that is grey to black in coloration. The branchlets are a deep red color unless shaded, in which case they will be green to bronze. Multiple stems sprout from a single rootstock. Lenticels do not protrude from the trunk(s), but the bark tends to swell between the lenticils.

The leaves have a petiole length of 5–16 millimeters. The blade has a length of 3.5–11 cm and a width of 1–6 cm. The leaves have a shape of lanceolate, elliptic, or oblanceolate. Leaves are oppositely arranged, with usually 3–4 veins per leaf side. The trichomes are appressed or slightly raised on lower surface of the leaf.

Cornus foemina flowers from March to June. The flower clusters are arranged as scymes with flat tops. The flowers are creamy white, small, and with non-showy bracts that frequently fall off the flower. Due to the loose nature of the bracts, samples may appear bractless as they leave behind only a small scar.

The fruits can vary in color from white to blue or purple, and they are globose drupes. White and blue fruits are considered a single morph, as they are blue when immature and white at maturity. The fruits are typically about 5 mm in diameter.

== Taxonomy ==
Cornus foemina was first described by botanist Philip Miller in 1768.

Cornus foemina falls under the subgenus Kraniopsis, which is categorized as blue-fruiting, loose-bracted, and oppositely-arranged leaves.

== Nomenclature ==
Synonyms of Cornus foemina are numerous, but this name has nomenclatural priority. It is, however, unclear which plant was intended by the name Cornus foemina, as the description originally provided is obscure and no type is available. No action has been taken in refuting Cornus foemina, so it is the accepted name solely based upon priority. Cornus foemina is unofficially considered a nomen dubium by scholars, and as such, in much of the literature, this species is referred to as either Cornus stricta or Swida foemina.

== Distribution and habitat ==
Cornus foemina is found most readily in the southeastern United States, distributed on the southeastern coast and towards the Mississippi River. It is found primarily along the coastal plain from eastern Virginia to central Florida, west to Louisiana, and north to southeastern Missouri.

It tends to grow in swamps, stream beds, marshes, coastal plains, and riparian forests. Cornus foemina grows well in poorly drained soils. Individual plants have the capability to adapt to soil types from clay to sandy.

Cornus foemina is as an understory tree and tolerates heavily shaded conditions, but will have more prolific fruiting with strong sunlight. Cornus foemina tolerates shaded and sunny conditions equally well, with a slight preference for sunny conditions. Cornus foemina has a good tolerance to drought but is prone to physical injury.

== Ecology ==
Cornus foemina provides a food source to many animals who reside in wet woodlands. White-tailed deer, cottontail rabbits, and beavers browse the leaves. The fruits are an important food source for birds, especially quail, catbirds, mockingbirds, American robins, and brown thrashers. The fruits are eaten by various species of songbirds, ducks, squirrels, chipmunks, and raccoons.

The flowers are visited and pollinated by various insects including wasps and flies such as Mischocyttarus mexicanus cubicola, Eumenes fraternus and Copestylum sexmaculatum. Cornus foemina is a host to the following moth and fungi species: Phomopsis, Caloptilia burgessiella, Caloptilia burgessiella, Heterocampa guttivitta, Cecrita guttivitta, Sarcinella pulchra, and Sarcinella pulchra.

Cornus foemina provides the ecosystem with erosion control. It is susceptible to powdery mildew disease.

== Human uses ==
Cornus foemina is a useful plant for many landscaping needs, including: rain gardens, drainage swales, areas prone to flooding, lake margins, and stream beds. It is used in these instances because it grows well in wet conditions, useful for erosion control, while not needing high levels of sunlight to thrive. Cornus foemina is rarely available in garden landscaping centers despite its usefulness.

Cornus foemina is a beneficial plant species to use in restoration. It is known to be an early successional woody plant and has appeared within three years in high density in a secondary successional bottomland hardwood forest.

== Conservation status ==
The conservation status of Cornus foemina is least concern on the IUCN Red List.
