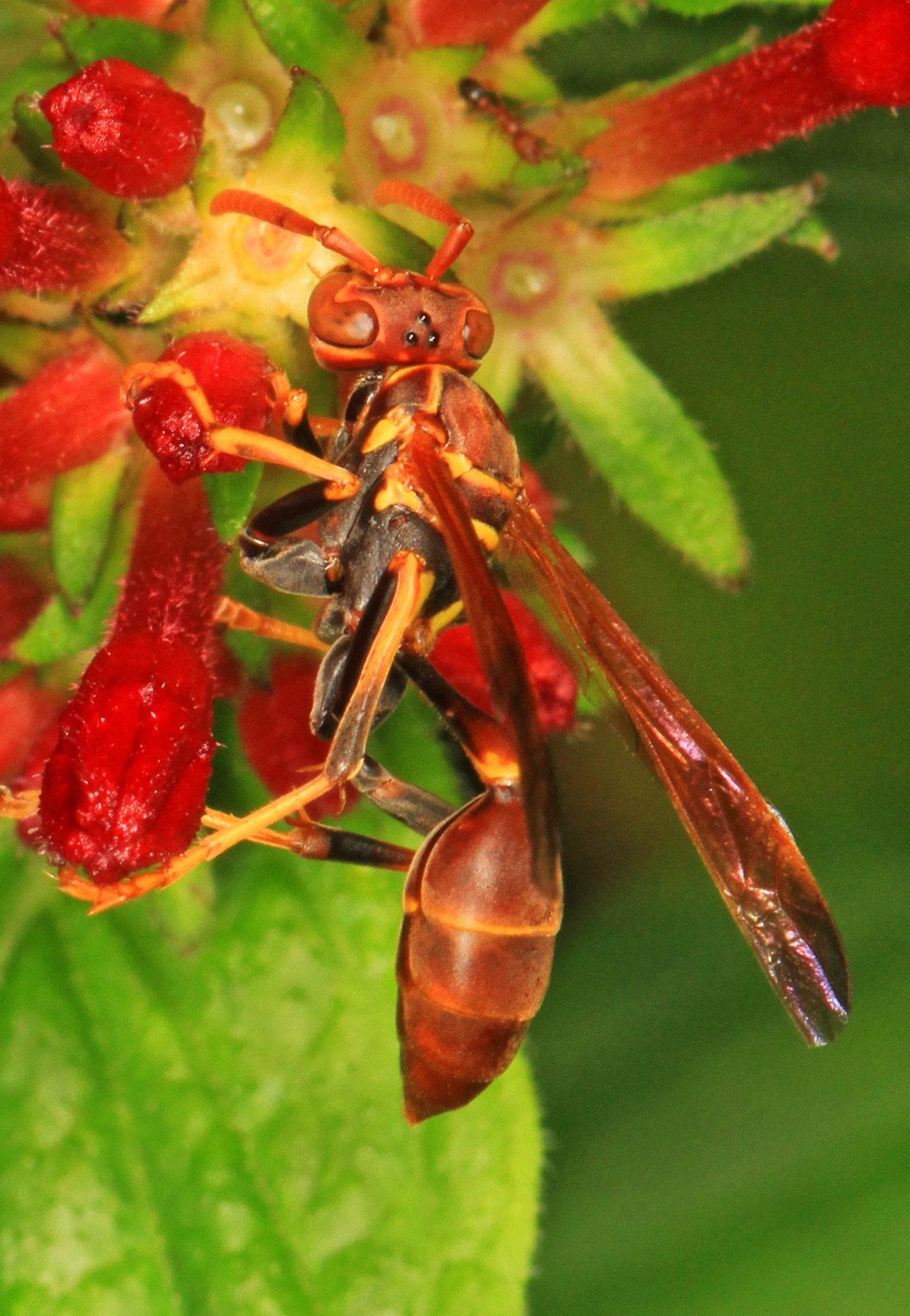
- M. mexicanus workers

Scientific classification
- Domain: Eukaryota
- Kingdom: Animalia
- Phylum: Arthropoda
- Class: Insecta
- Order: Hymenoptera
- Family: Vespidae
- Subfamily: Polistinae
- Genus: Mischocyttarus
- Species: M. mexicanus

Binomial name
- Mischocyttarus mexicanus (Saussure, 1854)

Subspecies
- M. m. mexicanus; M. m. cubicola

= Mischocyttarus mexicanus =

Species of wasp

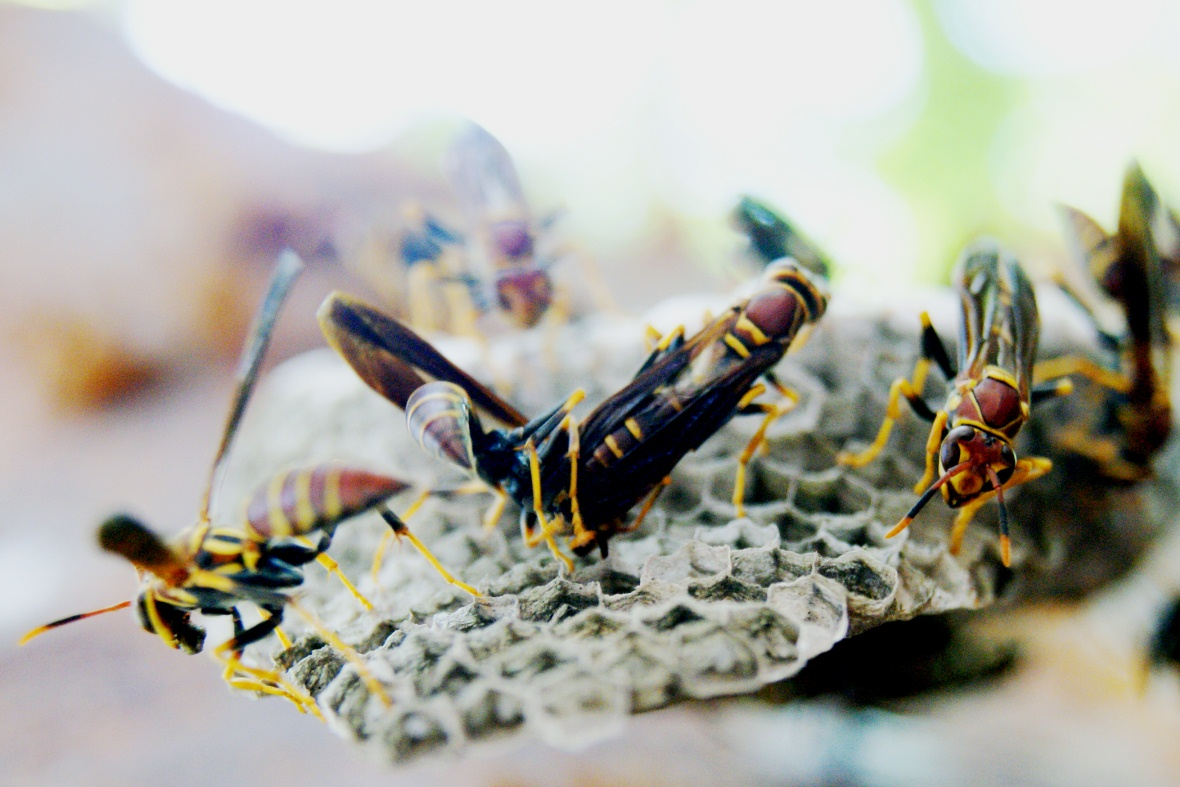
Avispa del papel-Paper wasp (Mischocyttarus mexicanus) (7623451086)

Mischocyttarus mexicanus is a New World species of paper wasp that exhibits facultative eusocial behavior and includes at least two subspecies living in the southern United States and Central America. This social wasp species is a good model for studying the selective advantage of different nesting tactics within a single species. M. mexicanus females can form nests both as individuals and as members of a colony, and are even known to switch between these two nesting strategies throughout their life, which is an unusual phenomenon in the field of social biology. Individuals in a colony have particular social roles that are plastic, as opposed to rigid castes, and brood parasitism and usurpation have been observed between unrelated conspecifics. They nest in a variety of types of plants and human constructions, although they have most frequently been observed in palm trees, and they are known to interact with a number of other species as prey, competitors over resources, or foragers.

== Taxonomy and phylogeny ==
M. mexicanus was described by Henri de Saussure in 1854, and it is a member of the social polistine wasp genus Mischocyttarus. Mischocyttarus is actually cited as the largest genus of social wasps, and it consists entirely of New World wasp species. M. mexicanus includes at least two subspecies: M. mexicanus cubicula (Richards, 1978) and M. mexicanus mexicanus (de Saussure). Mischocyttarus biology is, reportedly, very similar to that of several wasps of the genus Polistes.

== Description and identification ==
The genus Mischocyttarus is recognized by having asymmetrical internal and external lobes of the tarsal segments in adults and by appendix-like projections extending forward from the abdominal sternum of mature larvae. M. mexicanus belongs to a group of species within the genus that all share certain similarities, which includes Mischocyttarus flavitarsis and Mischocyttarus angulatus. This group of species is known for having a sharp secondary margin on their pronotum, which is the dorsal surface of the prothorax. In addition, males have very short, thick antennae. Females also have a clypeus, or head plate, with a flattened apex. M mexicanus typically has an orange-yellow color.

== Distribution and habitat ==
M. mexicanus is a New World wasp species found anywhere from the southern United States to Costa Rica. Subspecies M. m. mexicanus is predominantly present anywhere between Mexico and Costa Rica, though it has been sighted in Texas. On the other hand, the subspecies M. m. cubicola has been observed in the southeastern U.S., the Bahamas, Cuba, Puerto Rico, Texas, and Missouri. M. m. cubicola has been seen in almost every county of Florida except for the most northwestern counties of the state. It has been proposed that there is a distribution barrier that runs through northwestern Florida preventing the spread of M. m cubicola west of Alabama. However, this subspecies was observed in Texas and Missouri in 2009 nesting in a number of palm species, other trees, and human constructions.

== Colony cycle ==
The colony cycle of M. mexicanus was detailed extensively by Marcia Litte in the 1970s. The nests of M. mexicanus can be founded by one to twenty females, and while there is an "early" and "late" period for nests, they can be initiated at any point during the year. The founders of a nest are typically born together, and they do not range far from their natal nest site. There is a range in the sexual development of females, and each nest can have one or more queen. However, most females are reproductively viable and are capable of becoming a queen. The nests include a comb consisting of open cells made of paper, and are attached to leaves by a stem. The life cycle of a nest can be divided into pre-daughter or post-daughter stages, or sometimes referred to as pre-eclosion and post-eclosion nests. The duration of a nest is estimated at 8 months, although a large percentage of nests fail long before then.

== Behavior ==
=== Nesting tactics ===
M. mexicanus has been found to have two stable nesting strategies: haplometrosis and pleometrosis. Haplometrosis refers to the single-foundress nesting strategy, while pleometrosis refers to a strategy involving multiple cofoundresses. Both of these tactics are stable in M. mexicanus and it has been found that this is because each of these strategies is favorable in certain conditions, so this is an example of a context-dependent trait. Haplometric nests are more susceptible to greater mortality, and indeed up to 80% of haplometrotic nests fail within 20 days. However, haplometrosis has been found to be more frequent in the winter and spring, while pleometrosis is more frequent during the fall. It has been proposed that larger females are more likely to be solitary foundresses in the spring, and group foundresses in the summer, which a preference not found in smaller females. Additionally, when the number of potential habitats is experimentally decreased in an area, then nests are more likely to be founded by multiple females, and the converse has been found to hold true as well, indicating that these nesting tactics are context-dependent. Additionally, a female can switch between nesting tactics as an adult, suggesting that this trait is plastic.

=== Nest construction ===
Nests of M. mexicanus have been observed on saw palmetto (Serenoa repens), cabbage palm (Sabal palmetto), oak trees, Spanish moss, and human constructions. Fiber sources for the paper nests are often located rather close to the nest compared to food sources. However, it has been found that M. mexicanus nests are often constructed on the eastern-facing side of palm fronds, probably because this orientation increases the activity of the nest early in the day, as a consequence of the increased luminance and temperature. It was also found that foundresses preferred the outside curl of palm fronds over the inside curl and that the cabbage palm may provide greater protection against birds than other habitats.

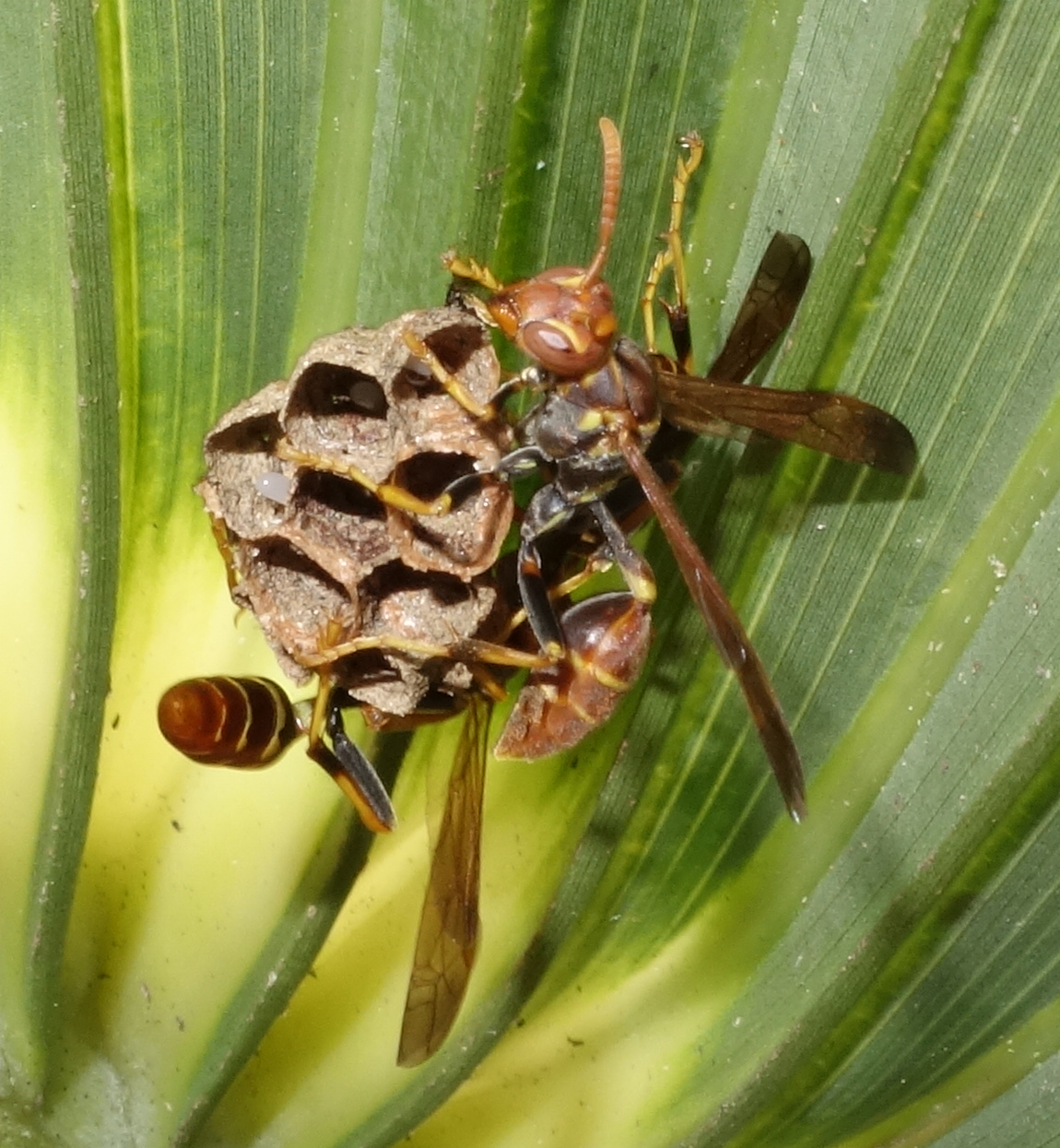
Mischocyttarus.mexicanus on the nest

=== Social structure ===
M. mexicanus females in a colony are at various levels of ovary development, and though there is typically one or more queen per colony, a relatively large proportion of females are reproductively viable. Females within a nest have been found to be highly variable, in that after a nest is initiated, one female may become the primary reproductive female, and the others may become subordinates. However, nest switching is frequent, and if a queen is removed, then a nestmate may replace her within the span of a week. The females in any given nest have a surprisingly low level of relatedness. Some reasons why M. mexicanus nests would be pleiotropic in spite of this low relatedness include reduced mortality rates of multiple-foundress nests, reduced development times, and larger colony sizes.

=== Cannibalism and usurpation ===
It has been observed that upon removal of a queen from the nest, the larvae and eggs gradually disappear over the course of a week. During this period no new cells of the nest are constructed, and at the end of this period, a subordinate wasp from the nest may begin to lay eggs and become the queen. It was also observed that non-nestmates are accepted into the colony when the foreign wasp is young, and when the nest itself is relatively new. However, an older wasp is often prevented from joining a colony, and older nests tend to reject non-nestmates of any age. These observations lead to speculation that M. mexicanus individuals reject foreigners based on the risk that they may usurp their nest. Intercolonial cannibalism was found to occur in nests, and foreign conspecific females may intrude on any given nest at a rate of once every 5 hours. Additionally, it is possible that M. mexicanus females may be brood parasites, cannibalizing eggs of a foreign nest and placing an egg of their own in the empty cell.

== Interaction with other species ==
=== Predators ===
Birds are a major source of predation on M. mexicanus. Carolina wrens, scrub jays, blue jays, common yellowthroats, cardinals, thrashers, mockingbirds, woodpeckers, and robins are suspected to be predators of this species and are thought to destroy nests. Additionally, spiders such as orb weavers Argiope aurantia and Nephila clavipes are thought to be predators of M. mexicanus.

Ants are commonly found raiding nests of this species, though it is rare that ants will raid a nest that hasn’t already been abandoned. Species including Campanotus floridanus, Crematogaster ashmeadi, and Pheidole floridana are known to raid live nests and eat the brood of the wasp colony. However, it was found that most commonly, a single ant will encounter a nest and be successfully deterred.

=== Other wasps ===
Apart from the conspecific interactions that are discussed above, it is expected that M. mexicanus competes with other wasp species for nesting places. It was found that nesting areas of M. mexicanus were mutually exclusive with Polistes exclamans and P. metricus, two sympatric wasp species that are also known to nest in similar habitats.

== Mimicry ==
The papaya fruit fly, Toxotrypana curvicauda, has evolved different color variations in populations living in distinct geographic regions. In the areas of Florida that it shares with M. mexicanus, it has been found to have a brown and dark orange-yellow color, which is similar to M. mexicanus. The females have a long ovipositor which is often mistaken as a stinger, and increases the resemblance of this species to M. mexicanus and other similar wasp species. It appears that the fruit flies also mimic certain defensive behaviors of wasps. When being handled by humans, the flies often curve their bodies and appear as if they are attempting to use their ovipositor as a stinger. The selective advantage of this morphological and behavioral mimicry has not yet been fully elucidated.

The papaya fruit fly Toxotrypana curvicauda is thought to be an example of a species that mimics the appearance of M. mexicanus to gain a selective advantage.

== Communication ==
Biting has been found to be a frequent occurrence between nestmates. The individuals that do the most foraging in a multi-foundress colony were found to be the least aggressive individuals of the group. It was also found that the individuals with the least developed ovaries were the individuals that did the most foraging of the group. Additionally, there has been speculation that M. mexicanus individuals accumulate a particular odor as they age, which is consistent with the observation that older females are more often rejected by foreign nests. Males were found to have exocrine gland cells in their gastral sternites, though they have very few ducted exocrine gland cells when compared to other species of Mischocyttarus. However, these observations are consistent with the idea that M. mexicanus, like other wasps, use chemicals to communicate through nestmate recognition, pheromone signaling, etc.

== Diet ==
M. mexicanus was found to forage both arthropod and nectar-based foods. It is suspected that they prey on arthropod larvae. Additionally, females have been observed foraging on palmetto and Lyonia flowers. Males are also commonly found on flowers, and they often pounce on other M. mexicanus individuals that are foraging on those flowers, which is presumably related to the mating habits of this species.
