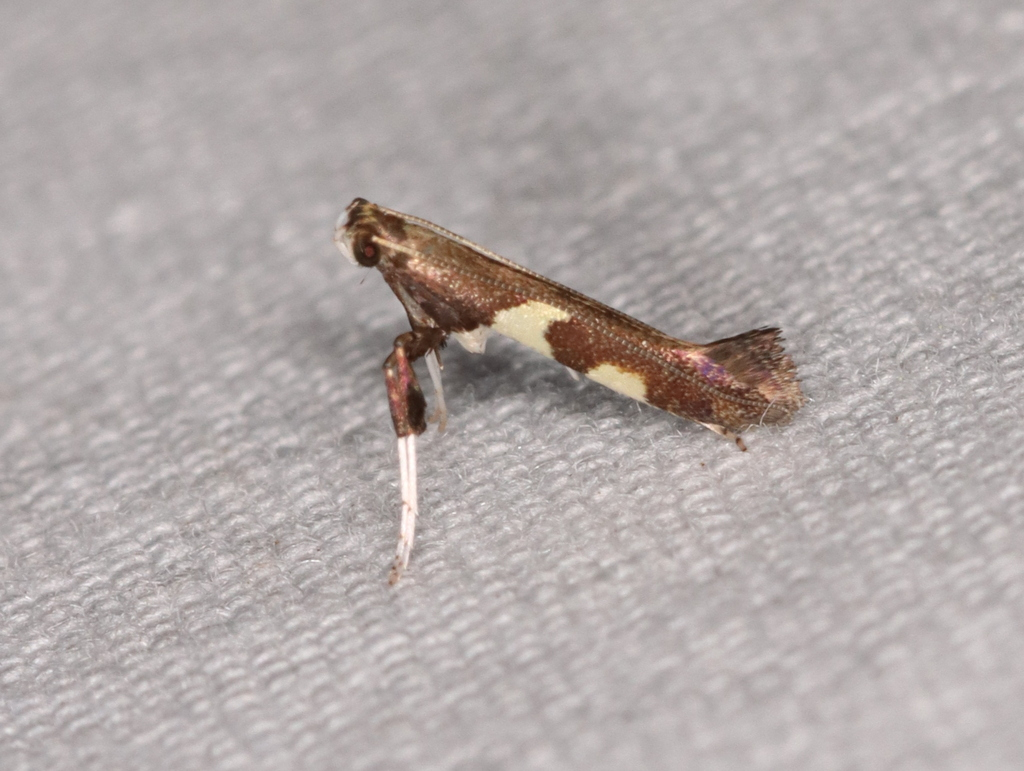

Scientific classification
- Kingdom: Animalia
- Phylum: Arthropoda
- Clade: Pancrustacea
- Class: Insecta
- Order: Lepidoptera
- Family: Gracillariidae
- Genus: Caloptilia
- Species: C. burgessiella

Binomial name
- Caloptilia burgessiella (Zeller, 1873)

= Caloptilia burgessiella =

Species of moth

Caloptilia burgessiella is a moth of the family Gracillariidae. It is known from Canada (Québec) and the United States (Massachusetts, California, Maine, Connecticut, New York, Vermont and Michigan).

The larvae feed on Cornus asperifolia, Cornus florida, Cornus racemosa and Vaccinium corymbosum. They mine the leaves of their host plant.
