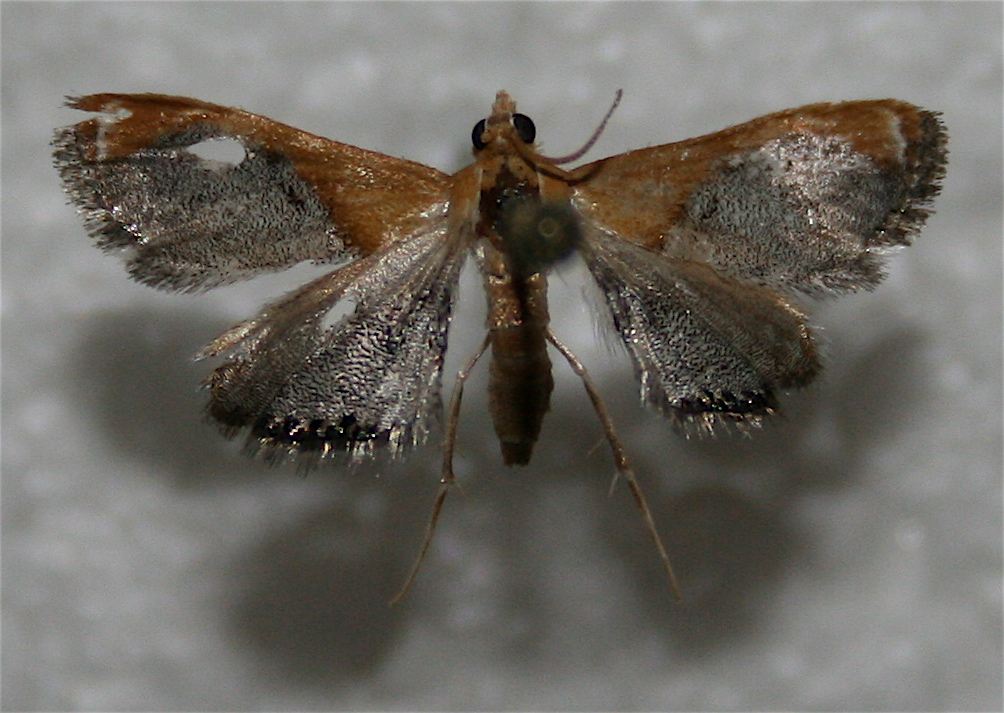
- Chalcoela iphitalis

Scientific classification
- Domain: Eukaryota
- Kingdom: Animalia
- Phylum: Arthropoda
- Class: Insecta
- Order: Lepidoptera
- Family: Crambidae
- Subfamily: Glaphyriinae
- Genus: Chalcoela; Zeller, 1872

= Chalcoela =

Genus of moths

Chalcoela is a genus of moths of the family Crambidae.

== Species ==
- Chalcoela iphitalis (Walker, 1859)
- Chalcoela pegasalis (Walker, 1859)
