= Mischocyttarus drewseni =

Scientific classification
- Kingdom: Animalia
- Phylum: Arthropoda
- Clade: Pancrustacea
- Class: Insecta
- Order: Hymenoptera
- Family: Vespidae
- Genus: Mischocyttarus
- Species: M. drewseni

Binomial name
- Mischocyttarus drewseni Saussure, 1857

Species of wasp

Mischocyttarus drewseni, which is sometimes spelled "drewsenii", is a social wasp in the family Vespidae. It is commonly found in Neotropical regions of South America, including Brazil, Peru, Venezuela, Colombia and Paraguay. This mid-sized wasp is about 1.5-1.8 cm and is typically dark brown or black in color. This species makes their nests out of woody plant fibers and create single combed nests with hexagonal cells which are typically found in low lying grass habitats or semi-urban environments. The colony cycle for this species is initiated by the queen who starts building the nest cell by cell. The nest construction process is highly elaborate and involves foraging for materials, creating cells, and heightening cell walls. It feeds on arthropods, plant nectar, and honeydew, and the species is very protective of its brood when it comes to defending them from their predators. The life cycle of this species has several stages with varying lengths, including egg, larval, pupal, and adult stages. As a social wasp species, there are several castes within the colony and different castes perform different specialized jobs with differing dominance and reproductive behaviors.

== Taxonomy and phylogeny ==
M. drewseni is a member of the family Vespidae, which is broken down into four subfamilies: paper wasps (subfamily Polistinae), pollen wasps (subfamily Masarinae), potter and mason wasps (subfamily Eumeninae), and yellow jackets (subfamily Vespinae). Within the Vespidae, M. drewseni belongs to the subfamily Polistinae which is typically found in tropical regions and comprises 25 genera. The asymmetrical tarsal lobes of Mischocyttarus separates it from the tribe Epiponini, and it is placed instead in its own tribe Mischocyttarini. Mischocyttarus larvae also have distinct first thoracic spiracles. Mischocyttarus is the largest genus of social wasps, containing over 250 species.

== Description and identification ==
M. drewseni are about 1.5 to 1.8 cm in length and are brown to black in color. They are considered mid-sized wasps and have slender bodies. In addition, the first abdominal section of the body is extended in length. The genus Mischocyttarus has several distinctive features, including asymmetrical tarsal lobes that are only found in Mischocyttarus adults. There are also distinctive features in Mischocyttarus larvae, including one to three lobes on their first abdominal segment and large thoracic spiracles.

== Distribution and habitat ==
M. drewseni is typically found in neotropical environments, primarily in South America. This species has been seen in Guyana, Suriname, Venezuela, Brazil, Peru, Paraguay, Colombia, and Argentina. Nests tend to be in swampy environments with tall grass. The nests are commonly surrounded by low grasses, which is where foraging takes place. There have also been M. drewseni nests found in semi-urban environments with more interactions with humans and human food. In these semi-urban environments, nests can be found under eaves of building, barns, or other protected places.

== Colony cycle ==
The colony cycle requires six months and begins with one or a few females founding the nest and beginning construction. These females build the colonies independently, without the initial aid of workers. This entails building individual cells and putting an egg in each cell; at this point, the growth rate of the colony is one cell (and egg) per day. This process continues until the first eggs begin to hatch, at which point growth of the colony stops. The first larvae born are all worker females who help in the formation of the nest once they have matured. Thus, once the larvae cocoon and pupate, the rate of growth increases. After the female workers mature, male and female non-workers are born and the nest continues to grow. During the next three to four months, more males and nonworkers are born in relation to the rest of the nest population. Next, the rate of growth decreases until the nest is no longer growing. At this point the phenomenon of abortion of larvae and pupae occurs, more cells are abandoned, and the adult population decreases. Finally, the nest is abandoned, signifying the end of the cycle.

== Nests ==
M. drewseni nests typically have one main comb and tend to be, on average, 14 cells in diameter. Each cell is hexagonal and about 4.75 mm in diameter. These cells can be built by members of any caste within the colony, and all of the cells look alike. These single combs can be suspended by a narrow stem, which is typically 10 mm in diameter. Usually, nests are constructed out of woody plant fiber. Pulp is utilized, as well, and can come from fence rails, planks, and dried cortex from stems from Verbenaceae, an herb plant. Sometimes, dried bark can be used.

=== Nest material foraging behavior ===
Foragers first go in search of water, which they collect in multiple trips. This water is then regurgitated on the surface of the nest material (typically plant fibers). The water serves as a type of glue, adhering the fibers of the nest material, beginning the formation of a ball. The water also serves to moisten and soften the fibers of the pulp so it is easier to manipulate for the formation of the nest. Using their mandibles, the foraging wasps remove the plant fibers (pulp) from its surface. This forms a ball of pulp, and the wasp will move around the immediate area in order to collect enough pulp (a ball that is about the size of its head, 2–4 mm). This collection process only takes a few minutes. At this point, the forager returns to the nest, carrying the pulp mass. Either the forager or the queen wasp will take the pulp and apply it to the growing nest. The forager repeats this process multiple times in a day, usually for many hours. There is evidence that foragers collect the same foraging material on each trip. In nests that are made out of materials with distinct colors, researchers found that each forager collected only one of the colors in the nest, creating a colorful nest.

=== Beginning of nest construction ===
On the first day of nest construction, the foundress (or queen) forms the nest stem. This stem is created from a combination of pulp filaments and secretions from the foundress’ oral cavity. It serves to suspend the nest in the air when connected to a branch or another object. In the evening, the full stem has been created and nest material is added to the bottom of the stem in a flat, horizontal orientation. The next load is added the next morning, which expands from the flat bottom of the stem. After this, she thickens the new formation, and then adds a shallow cup-shaped structure that will serve as a cell base. Further steps form the walls of the cell. Once the first cell is created, an egg is laid in it, and the foundress makes the next cell. This whole initiation process occurs in less than one day.

=== Cell construction ===
The second cell is built on one of the sides of the first cell, and each cell thereafter is built from two adjacent cells so that only four sides of the hexagon need to be constructed. Eggs are laid within the cells once they are constructed. Once the larvae start growing in the cells, workers come around and raise the cell height to keep up with growing larvae; the cell walls keep the larvae safe. Workers will move around the nest looking for cell walls to heighten and inspect the cell with their antennae. A worker will choose a cell wall to raise based on the ratio of cell wall height to the height of the larvae as opposed to the cell height in relation to other cells. Workers add to the cell walls with pulp. Strangely, when workers approach with pulp, the larvae begin stretching, perhaps as a signal to show what cells are in most desperate need of heightening. When heightening walls, the pulp is first laid on the walls and then worked by the worker's mandible to the proper texture and thickness. Once the larvae have matured into adults, the cells are vacated and new eggs are laid. Since a high wall is no longer needed, a worker chews down the wall and uses the extra pulp elsewhere in the nest.

== Enemies ==
Ants are a serious enemy to M. drewseni and there have been many cases of ants completely decimating a nest, destroying all of the eggs and consuming all of the nest's nectar. After the ants destroy the nest, many adult wasps may stay nearby but never re-enter the nest. This form of attack is common and many other Mischocyttarus species are victims of the same phenomenon. In observations of nests, other unidentified predators have attacked the nests at night, taking bites out of the nest, sometimes wiping out entire combs, leaving just the stem. While the brood is usually the target of predation, spiders sometimes prey on adult M. drewseni. If the nest is stripped of brood or abandoned, there is evidence that other wasp species (Polistes versicolor) will rear their brood in the empty M. drewseni nests.

== Defense ==
Due to the prevalence and devastation of ant attacks, M. drewseni has developed a way to protect themselves, but mainly their brood, from their predators. Females have a gland on their gaster that secretes a liquid; females are commonly seen rubbing their gaster along the stem of the nest. This secretion, which is spread on the stem, then, somehow prevents ants from climbing on the stem to reach the nest and the brood. In experiments, when ants come in contact with this secretion, they have a violent reaction and retract away from the secretion, suggesting that it is a chemical repellant of sorts. In addition, the structure of the nest itself and the morphology of the wasp seems to support a co-evolution of this defensive mechanism. The length of the stem separates the nest from any place that an ant would be. In addition, the elongated first abdominal piece of the wasp serves to allow the secretion to be spread over the whole stem, whose narrow diameter makes secretions economical. This system of defense is also very practical because it allows the female to forage and leave the brood unattended without putting them at risk. This repellant seems to be very effective with some ants, but not strong enough to derail army ants, as they travel in huge groups.

== Life cycle ==
=== Egg and larval phases ===
It is challenging to determine the length of the egg phase because eggs are sometimes eaten as part of a dominance struggle. However, since the first eggs, which produce the first workers, are much less likely to get eaten, one can obtain a general sense of the timing. Most of these first eggs hatch within 10–13 days of being laid. Once the eggs hatch, the larval stage begins. The duration of this phase varies significantly, mostly based on the development of the colony. As the development of the colony varies, so do the feeding practices, and rate of feeding effects the duration of the larval stage. The length of the larval stages peaks at 60 days, but the average larvae remained in the larval phase for 15–30 days.

=== Pupal stage ===
Unlike the larval stage, the pupal stage seems much less variable. For most, it lasted 14–16 days and temperature seemed to be the determining factor in shortening or lengthening the stage. Sex did not affect the length of the stage. When compared to other wasps, the M. drewseni pupal stage is very stable and less prone to variation. Graphic representations of the duration of pupal stage vs. date shows that the duration seems to ebb and flow, being very long in the end of October and dipping significantly in the month of December.

=== Adulthood ===
Once wasps emerge as mature adults, they spend the first 2–3 days on the nest doing very little. After the first 3 idle days, workers can be told from non-workers because workers stay on the nest longer. A wasp that leaves the nest for any reason immediately after those 3 days is considered a non-worker. Lifetime in the nest, then, seems directly dependent on ones role: queens lived an average of 61 days, workers lived about 31 days, non-workers survived for about 5 days, and males only survived about 4.8 days. This is considered evidence that the caste system determines the individual wasp's life course. Note that these numbers are based entirely on the number of days that a wasp is seen in the nest. In some cases, including males, the wasps live the majority of their lives outside of the nest.

== Dominance behaviors ==
Most observed dominant behaviors occurred between females, namely co-foundresses. Most of these interactions between co-foundresses, however, were peaceful and non-aggressive, usually pertaining to trading pulp or food. Compared to other wasp species, M. drewseni was much less aggressive and had many fewer dominance interactions. In fact, many co-foundresses were not involved in any aggressive behaviors with other co-foundresses. Data suggests that nests can have anywhere from 2–8, or more, co-foundresses and the number of dominations observed tends to increase with the number of co-foundresses, where females are, to a certain extent, fighting to maintain power and status in the nest.

== Specialization of tasks ==
The queen serves as the primary egg layer of the nest and begins the nest construction at the beginning of a season. If she adopt an already existing nest, it is her duty to clean out the nest and prepare it for egg laying. The queen is the top of the caste system and dominates in any dominance interaction with a subordinate. These interactions are fairly common for the queen. Queens tend to forage mainly for pulp, but they have sometimes been observed foraging for insects as well. While queens rarely forage for nectar, co-foundresses and workers do so frequently. Workers are also in charge of distributing food to other adults and larvae when they return from foraging. Workers are key in building cells and raising their walls. Non-workers, on the other hand, rarely forage themselves and depend on the collections of food that foragers bring back to the nest; this behavior defines non-workers. This caste has also been observed to leave the nest for extended periods of time to either mate or forage for themselves. They do, however, contribute to defense of the nest. There have also been examples of non-workers breaking down cell walls after larvae have matured, so it seems like the distinction between worker and non-worker is less clear than was previously thought. Finally, males aid in keeping the nest cool in hot temperatures by fanning their wings and they rely heavily on the food that foragers bring back to the nest. They sometimes swarm the foragers in order to get the nectar, pulp, and insects that the foragers bring.

== Male reproductive behavior ==
Male M. drewseni only spend 4.8 days in the nest after they emerge and spend the rest of their lives outside of the nest. Once they leave the nest, males tend to circulate where specific females are because of feeding and foraging opportunities. On their circuits, males seek out nectar from flowers and also seek out mates. Observations have shown that if a male sees a female nearby, he will alter his flight path and pounce on the female to attempt copulation. In most cases, the female is able to shake off the male and fly away. If two males come in contact with the same female, they will usually attack each other and the male that first found the female will try to bite the second male.

== Diet ==
M. drewseni typically feed on nectar, pulp (paper), and other insects. Most foraging for food occurs close to the nest (within 40–50 m). When this species preys on other insects, it typically snatches the prey, chews it into a pulp and then returns to the nest. Foragers also have been seen attacking insects that are stuck on spiders’ webs. ll captured prey tends to be fairly substantial in size (greater than 3 mm) but small enough that the wasp could chew the whole insect before returning to the nest. Because foragers chew their prey so quickly, it can be very hard to determine exactly what their prey is. In fact, M. flavitarsis is the only Mischocyttarus species with published prey information. They reportedly prey on flies and caterpillars and, occasionally, meat and fish. Aside from various prey, nectar plays a key role in M. drewseni diets. This nectar is typically consumed from the buds and flowers of Althernanthera ficoidae, Hyptis atrorubens, and Clidemia hirta. Once a wasp finds a good source of nectar, it tends to return to it many times, just like workers return to the same nest material supply. This seems to be an individual venture, as there is no communication between foragers when a good nectar supply is located.
