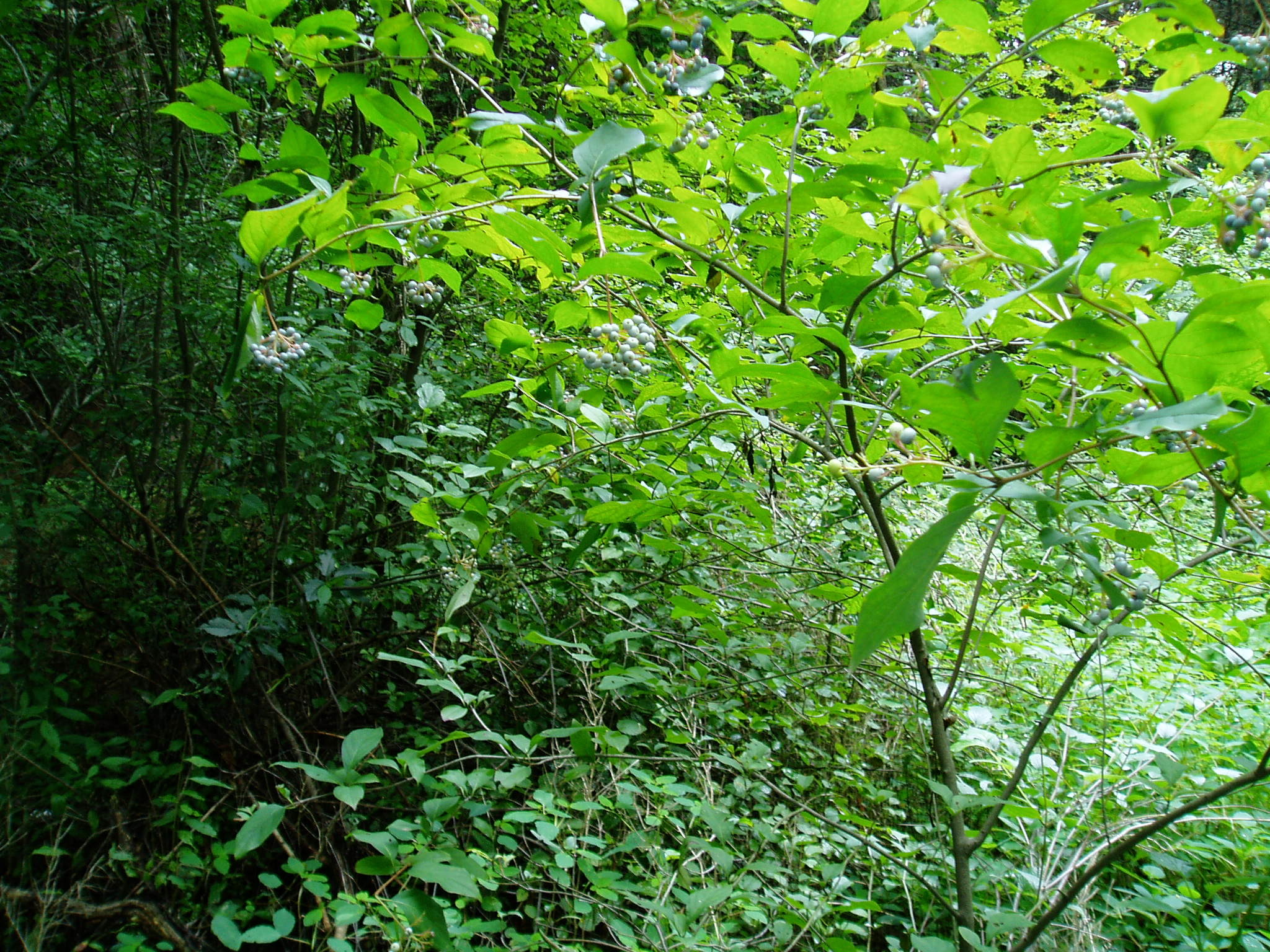
- Foliage and berries of Cornus x arnoldia, a hybrid between C. amomum and C. racemosa.

Scientific classification
- Kingdom: Plantae
- Clade: Tracheophytes
- Clade: Angiosperms
- Clade: Eudicots
- Clade: Asterids
- Order: Cornales
- Family: Cornaceae
- Genus: Cornus
- Subgenus: Cornus subg. Kraniopsis
- Species: C. × arnoldiana

Binomial name
- Cornus × arnoldiana Rehd.

= Cornus × arnoldiana =

Species of tree

Cornus × arnoldiana, the Arnold dogwood, is a hybrid dogwood native to eastern North America. It is reported from Ontario, Missouri, Ohio, Pennsylvania, and Massachusetts. It is a member of the dogwood genus Cornus and the family Cornaceae.

Arnold dogwood is derived from natural crosses between silky dogwood (Cornus amomum) and gray dogwood (Cornus racemosa). Intermediate shrubs were first noted in the Arnold Arboretum by Alfred Rehder, who described and named the hybrid. The name is an allusion to the place of its discovery.

== Classification ==
The Arnold dogwood is usually included in the dogwood genus Cornus as Cornus × arnoldiana Rehd., although it is sometimes segregated in a separate genus as Swida × arnoldiana (Rehd.) Soják.
