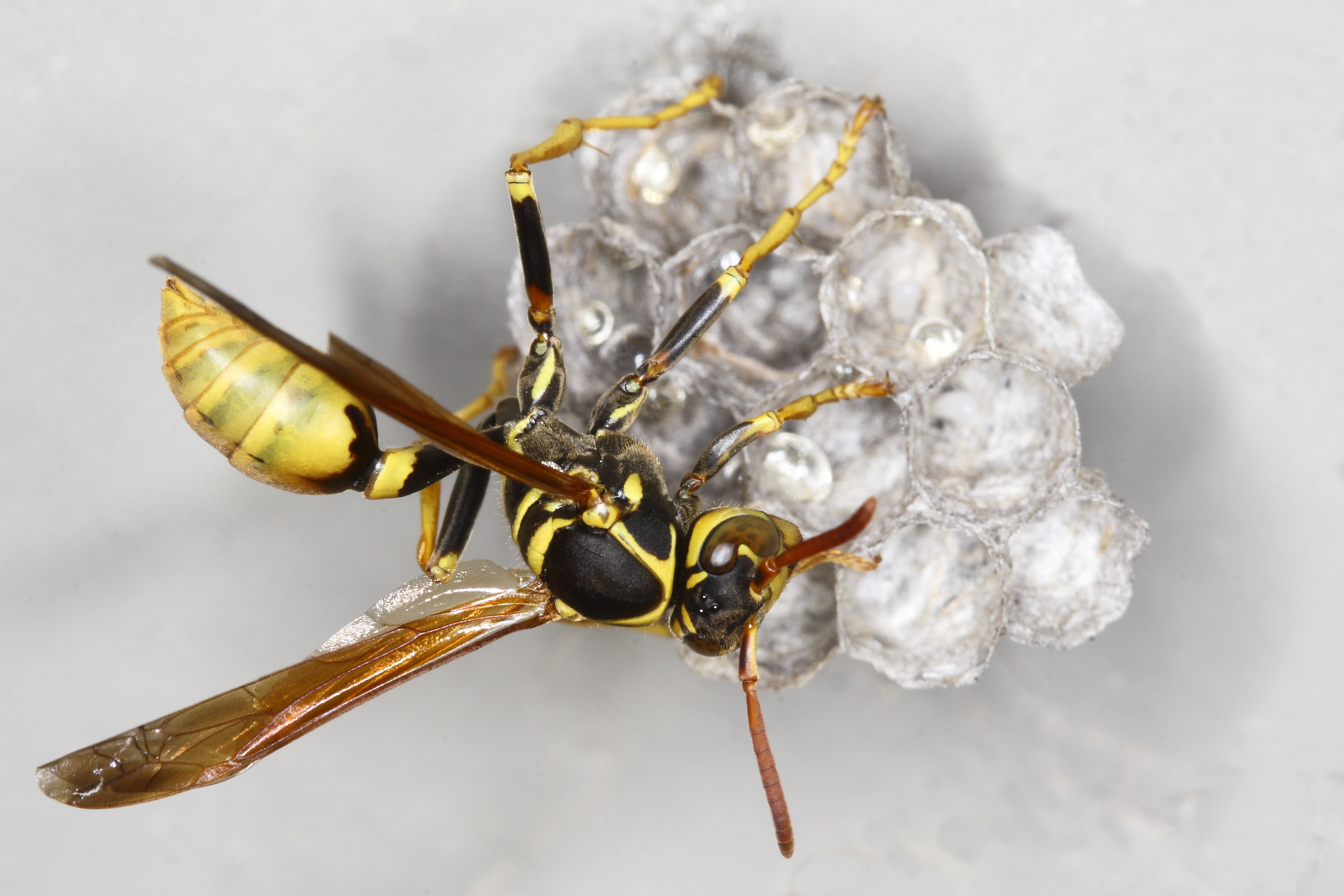
- Western paper wasp (Mischocyttarus flavitarsis) building a nest

Scientific classification
- Domain: Eukaryota
- Kingdom: Animalia
- Phylum: Arthropoda
- Class: Insecta
- Order: Hymenoptera
- Family: Vespidae
- Subfamily: Polistinae
- Tribe: Mischocyttarini
- Genus: Mischocyttarus; Saussure, 1853

Species
- >200 species

= Mischocyttarus =

Genus of wasps

Mischocyttarus is a very large, primarily Neotropical genus of social wasps with a few species found also in the Nearctic region. It is the only member of the tribe Mischocyttarini; the asymmetrical tarsal lobes of Mischocyttarus separates it from the tribe Epiponini. Mischocyttarus is the largest genus of social wasps, containing over 200 species and subspecies. Mischocyttarus wasps build a relatively simple, single comb nest. Sometimes, the nest is built within a meter of the nest of Polistes carnifex. Foraging adults bring nectar and small caterpillars back to the nest to feed to the developing larvae which are individually housed in separate cells in the nest. Not all nests have a female with developed ovaries. Their biology is similar to that of species in the genus Polistes. However, Mischocyttarus appear to show considerably more social and reproductive flexibility than Polistes.

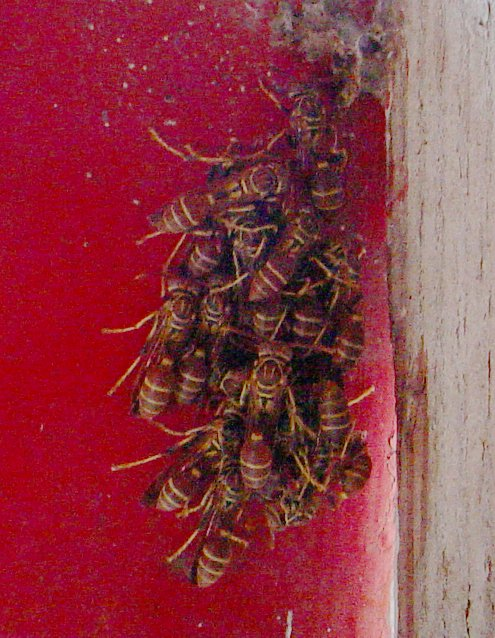
Mischocyttarus mexicanus cubicola huddling together in early winter

== Species ==
- Mischocyttarus achagua Silveira, 2013
- Mischocyttarus acreanus Silveira, 2006
- Mischocyttarus acunai Alayo 1972
- Mischocyttarus adjectus Zikan, 1935
- Mischocyttarus adolphi Zikan, 1949
- Mischocyttarus alboniger Richards, 1978
- Mischocyttarus alfkenii (Ducke, 1904)
- Mischocyttarus alienus Richards 1978
- Mischocyttarus alternatus Zikan, 1949
- Mischocyttarus anchicaya Silveira, 2015
- Mischocyttarus angulatus Richards 1945
- Mischocyttarus annulatus Richards, 1978
- Mischocyttarus anthracinus Richards, 1945
- Mischocyttarus arawak Silveira, 2013
- Mischocyttarus aripuanaensis Silveira, 1998
- Mischocyttarus artifex (Ducke, 1914)
- Mischocyttarus awa Silveira, 2013
- Mischocyttarus baconi Starr, 2011
- Mischocyttarus bahiae Richards, 1945
- Mischocyttarus bahiaensis Zikan 1949
- Mischocyttarus barbatulus Richards, 1978
- Mischocyttarus barbatus Richards 1945
- Mischocyttarus basimacula (Cameron, 1906)
- Mischocyttarus belemensis Cooper, 1997
- Mischocyttarus bequaertii Richards, 1945
- Mischocyttarus bertonii Ducke, 1918
- Mischocyttarus brackmanni Zikan 1949
- Mischocyttarus bruneri Bequard & Salt, 1931
- Mischocyttarus buyssoni (Ducke, 1906)
- Mischocyttarus cabauna Zikan, 1949
- Mischocyttarus caixuana Silveira, 2015
- Mischocyttarus campestris Raw, 1987
- Mischocyttarus capichaba Zikan 1949
- Mischocyttarus carbonarius (Saussure, 1854)
- Mischocyttarus carinulatus Zikan, 1949
- Mischocyttarus cassununga (Ihering, 1903)
- Mischocyttarus catharinaensis Zikan 1949
- Mischocyttarus cearensis Richards, 1945
- Mischocyttarus cerberus Ducke 1918
- Mischocyttarus chalucas Snelling, 1983
- Mischocyttarus chanchamayoensis Richards, 1978
- Mischocyttarus chapadae (Fox 1898)
- Mischocyttarus chloroecus Cooper, 1998
- Mischocyttarus cinerasceus Zikan 1949
- Mischocyttarus claretianus Zikan 1949
- Mischocyttarus clavicornis Cooper, 1997
- Mischocyttarus cleomenes Richards, 1945
- Mischocyttarus clypeatus Zikan 1935
- Mischocyttarus collarellus Richards, 1940
- Mischocyttarus collaris (Ducke, 1904)
- Mischocyttarus commixtus Richards 1945
- Mischocyttarus confirmatus Zikan 1935
- Mischocyttarus confusoides Zikan 1949
- Mischocyttarus confusus Zikan 1935
- Mischocyttarus consimilis Zikan 1949
- Mischocyttarus cooperi Richards, 1978
- Mischocyttarus costaricensis Richards 1945
- Mischocyttarus crypticus Zikan 1949
- Mischocyttarus cryptobius Zikán 1935
- Mischocyttarus cubensis (Saussure, 1854)
- Mischocyttarus curitybanus Zikan 1949
- Mischocyttarus deceptus (Fox, 1895)
- Mischocyttarus decimus Richards, 1978
- Mischocyttarus declaratus Zikan 1935
- Mischocyttarus dimorphus Zikan 1949
- Mischocyttarus drewseni (Saussure, 1854)
- Mischocyttarus duckei Buysson, 1909
- Mischocyttarus duidensis Richards 1945
- Mischocyttarus ecuadorensis Zikan 1949
- Mischocyttarus efferus Silveira, 2006
- Mischocyttarus elegantulus Zikan 1949
- Mischocyttarus embera Silveira, 2013
- Mischocyttarus extinctus Zikan 1935
- Mischocyttarus fidus Silveira, 2006
- Mischocyttarus filiformis (Saussure, 1854)
- Mischocyttarus filipendulus Cooper, 1998
- Mischocyttarus fisheri Snelling 1970
- Mischocyttarus fitzgeraldi Bequard, 1938
- Mischocyttarus flavicans (Fabricius, 1804)
- Mischocyttarus flavicornis Zikan 1935
- Mischocyttarus flavitarsis (Saussure 1854)
- Mischocyttarus flavoniger Zikan 1949
- Mischocyttarus flavoscutellatus Zikan 1935
- Mischocyttarus foveatus Richards, 1940
- Mischocyttarus fraudulentus Richards, 1978
- Mischocyttarus frontalis (Fox, 1898)
- Mischocyttarus funerulus Zikan 1949
- Mischocyttarus garbei Zikan 1935
- Mischocyttarus giffordi Raw, 1987
- Mischocyttarus gomesi Silveira, 2013
- Mischocyttarus gynandromorphus Richards, 1945
- Mischocyttarus haywardi Willink 1953
- Mischocyttarus heliconius Richards, 1941
- Mischocyttarus hirsutus Richards 1945
- Mischocyttarus hirtulus Zikan, 1949
- Mischocyttarus hoffmanni Zikan 1949
- Mischocyttarus ignotus Zikan 1949
- Mischocyttarus iheringi Zikan 1935
- Mischocyttarus illusorius Richards 1978
- Mischocyttarus imeldai Zikan 1949
- Mischocyttarus imitator (Ducke, 1904)
- Mischocyttarus inca Zikan 1949
- Mischocyttarus inexspectatus Cooper, 1997
- Mischocyttarus injucundus (Saussure, 1854)
- Mischocyttarus insolitus Zikan 1949
- Mischocyttarus interjectus Zikan 1935
- Mischocyttarus interruptus Richards, 1978
- Mischocyttarus juditae Cooper, 1997
- Mischocyttarus labiatus (Fabricius, 1804)
- Mischocyttarus lanei Zikan 1949
- Mischocyttarus latior (Fox, 1898)
- Mischocyttarus latissimus Richards, 1978
- Mischocyttarus laurae Silveira, 2006
- Mischocyttarus lecointei (Ducke, 1904)
- Mischocyttarus lemoulti (Buysson, 1909)
- Mischocyttarus leucoecus Cooper, 1998
- Mischocyttarus lilae Willink 1953
- Mischocyttarus lindigi Richards 1945
- Mischocyttarus longicornis Zikan 1949
- Mischocyttarus lules Willink 1953
- Mischocyttarus macarenae Cooper, 1998
- Mischocyttarus maculipennis Cooper, 1998
- Mischocyttarus magdalensis Silveira, 2006
- Mischocyttarus malaris Richards, 1978
- Mischocyttarus maracaensis Raw, 1989
- Mischocyttarus marginatus (Fox 1898)
- Mischocyttarus mastigophorus Richards 1978
- Mischocyttarus mattogrossoensis Zikan, 1935
- Mischocyttarus melanarius (Cameron, 1906)
- Mischocyttarus melanoleucus Richards, 1978
- Mischocyttarus melanops Cooper, 1996
- Mischocyttarus melanopygus Richards, 1945
- Mischocyttarus melanoxanthus Richards, 1978
- Mischocyttarus mendax Richards, 1978
- Mischocyttarus metathoracicus (Saussure, 1854)
- Mischocyttarus metoecus Richards, 1940
- Mischocyttarus mexicanus (Saussure, 1854)
- Mischocyttarus mimicus Zikan 1935
- Mischocyttarus minifoveatus Cooper, 1998
- Mischocyttarus mirificus Zikan 1935
- Mischocyttarus mirus Silveira, 2006
- Mischocyttarus mixtus Richards, 1978
- Mischocyttarus mocsaryi (Ducke, 1909)
- Mischocyttarus montei Zikan 1949
- Mischocyttarus montivagus Cooper, 1996
- Mischocyttarus moralesi Zikan, 1949
- Mischocyttarus moronae Cooper, 1996
- Mischocyttarus mourei Zikan 1949
- Mischocyttarus muisca Silveira, 2013
- Mischocyttarus mysticus Silveira, 2006
- Mischocyttarus napoensis Richards, 1978
- Mischocyttarus narinensis Cooper, 1998
- Mischocyttarus naumanni Richards, 1978
- Mischocyttarus navajo Bequard, 1933
- Mischocyttarus nigroclavatus Zikan 1949
- Mischocyttarus nigropygialis Zikan 1949
- Mischocyttarus nomurae Richards 1978
- Mischocyttarus occiduus Silveira, 2006
- Mischocyttarus occultus Cooper, 1996
- Mischocyttarus oecothrix Richards 1940
- Mischocyttarus omicron Richards, 1978
- Mischocyttarus onorei Cooper, 1996
- Mischocyttarus oreophilus Zikan 1949
- Mischocyttarus ornatus Zikan 1949
- Mischocyttarus pallidipectus (Smith 1857)
- Mischocyttarus pallidipes Richards, 1945
- Mischocyttarus pallidus Zikán 1949
- Mischocyttarus paraguayensis Zikan 1935
- Mischocyttarus parallelogrammus Zikan 1935
- Mischocyttarus paris Silveira, 2006
- Mischocyttarus paulistanus Zikan 1935
- Mischocyttarus peduncularius Zikan 1949
- Mischocyttarus pelor Carpenter 1988
- Mischocyttarus pertinax Silveira, 2006
- Mischocyttarus peruanus Zikan 1949
- Mischocyttarus peruviensis Richards 1945
- Mischocyttarus petiolatus Richards, 1978
- Mischocyttarus phthisicus (Fabricius 1793)
- Mischocyttarus piceus Zikan 1949
- Mischocyttarus picturatus Bequaert, 1938
- Mischocyttarus piger Richards, 1945
- Mischocyttarus plaumanni Zikan 1949
- Mischocyttarus polymorphus Cooper, 1998
- Mischocyttarus porantin Silveira, 2006
- Mischocyttarus prominulus Richards 1941
- Mischocyttarus proximus Zikan 1949
- Mischocyttarus pseudomimeticus (Schulz, 1903)
- Mischocyttarus punctatus (Ducke, 1904)
- Mischocyttarus reclusus Cooper, 1996
- Mischocyttarus reflexicollis Zikan 1949
- Mischocyttarus rhadinomerus Cooper, 1997
- Mischocyttarus richardsi Zikan 1949
- Mischocyttarus rodriguesi Silveira, 2015
- Mischocyttarus rotundicollis (Cameron, 1912)
- Mischocyttarus rufescens Zikan, 1949
- Mischocyttarus rufidens (Saussure, 1854)
- Mischocyttarus rufipes Zikan 1949
- Mischocyttarus rufomaculatus Richards 1945
- Mischocyttarus ryani Silveira, 2015
- Mischocyttarus santacruzi Raw, 2000
- Mischocyttarus saturatus Zikan, 1949
- Mischocyttarus saussurei Zikan 1949
- Mischocyttarus schadei Zikan 1949
- Mischocyttarus schunkei Zikan 1949
- Mischocyttarus sericeus Richards, 1978
- Mischocyttarus silvicola Zikan 1949
- Mischocyttarus smithii (Saussure, 1854)
- Mischocyttarus socialis (Saussure, 1854)
- Mischocyttarus souzalopesi Zikan 1949
- Mischocyttarus sprucei Cooper, 1997
- Mischocyttarus stenoecus Richards 1978
- Mischocyttarus subornatus Zikan 1949
- Mischocyttarus superus Richards, 1940
- Mischocyttarus surinamensis (Saussure, 1854)
- Mischocyttarus suzannae Silveira, 2013
- Mischocyttarus sylvestris Richards 1945
- Mischocyttarus synoecus Richards 1940
- Mischocyttarus tapuya (Schulz, 1905)
- Mischocyttarus tarmensis Richards 1945
- Mischocyttarus tayacaja Silveira, 2013
- Mischocyttarus tayrona Silveira, 2015
- Mischocyttarus tectus Cooper, 1996
- Mischocyttarus telembi Cooper, 1997
- Mischocyttarus tenuis Richards 1945
- Mischocyttarus tertius Richards, 1978
- Mischocyttarus thrypticus Richards 1945
- Mischocyttarus timbira Silveira, 2006
- Mischocyttarus tolensis Richards 1941
- Mischocyttarus tomentosus Zikan, 1935
- Mischocyttarus transandinus Richards, 1978
- Mischocyttarus travassosi Zikan 1949
- Mischocyttarus tricolor Richards 1945
- Mischocyttarus tunari Cooper, 1996
- Mischocyttarus undulatus (Ducke, 1905)
- Mischocyttarus uniformis Silveira, 2013
- Mischocyttarus vaqueroi Zikan, 1949
- Mischocyttarus veracrucis Cooper, 1997
- Mischocyttarus verissimoi Silveira, 2015
- Mischocyttarus villarricanus Zikan 1935
- Mischocyttarus vredeni Richards, 1978
- Mischocyttarus wagneri (Buysson, 1908)
- Mischocyttarus waunan Silveira, 2013
- Mischocyttarus weyrauchi Zikan 1949
- Mischocyttarus woytkowskyi Richards, 1978
- Mischocyttarus wygodzinskyi Zikan, 1949
- Mischocyttarus xanthocerus Richards 1945
- Mischocyttarus xavante Silveira, 2010
- Mischocyttarus ypiranguensis Fonseca, 1926
- Mischocyttarus zikaninus Richards, 1978
