= Mischocyttarus santacruzi =

Scientific classification
- Domain: Eukaryota
- Kingdom: Animalia
- Phylum: Arthropoda
- Class: Insecta
- Order: Hymenoptera
- Family: Vespidae
- Subfamily: Polistinae
- Genus: Mischocyttarus
- Species: M. santacruzi

Binomial name
- Mischocyttarus santacruzi Raw, 2000

Species of wasp

Mischocyttarus santacruzi is a species of social wasp from the Vespidae family. It was first discovered in the Atlantic Forest from Ilhéus, Southern portion of Bahia State, Northeastern Brazil.
