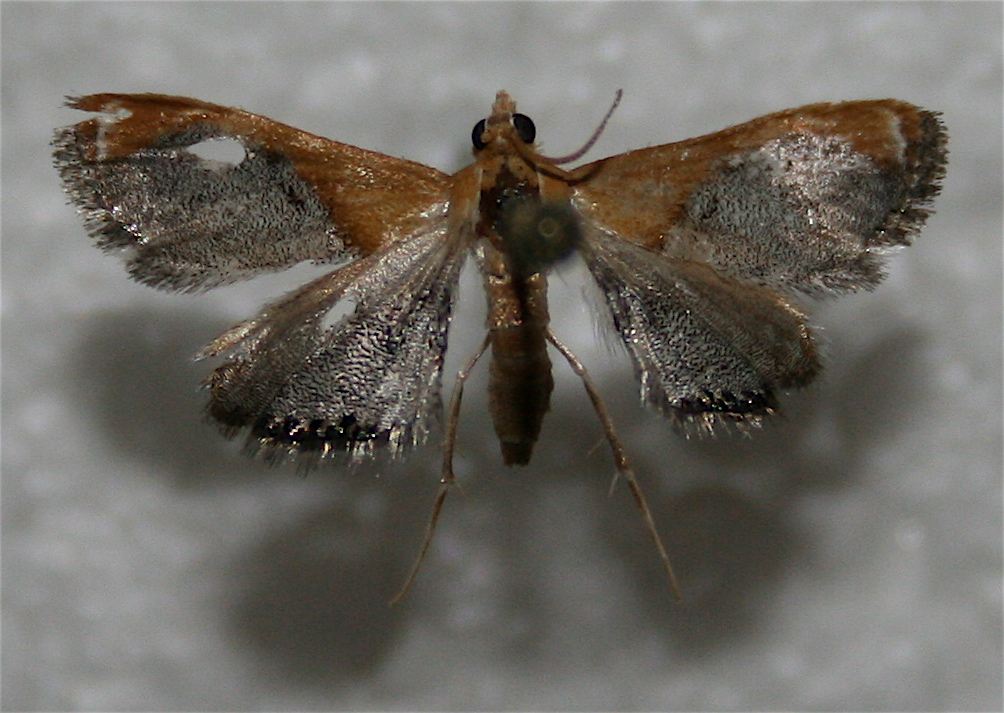

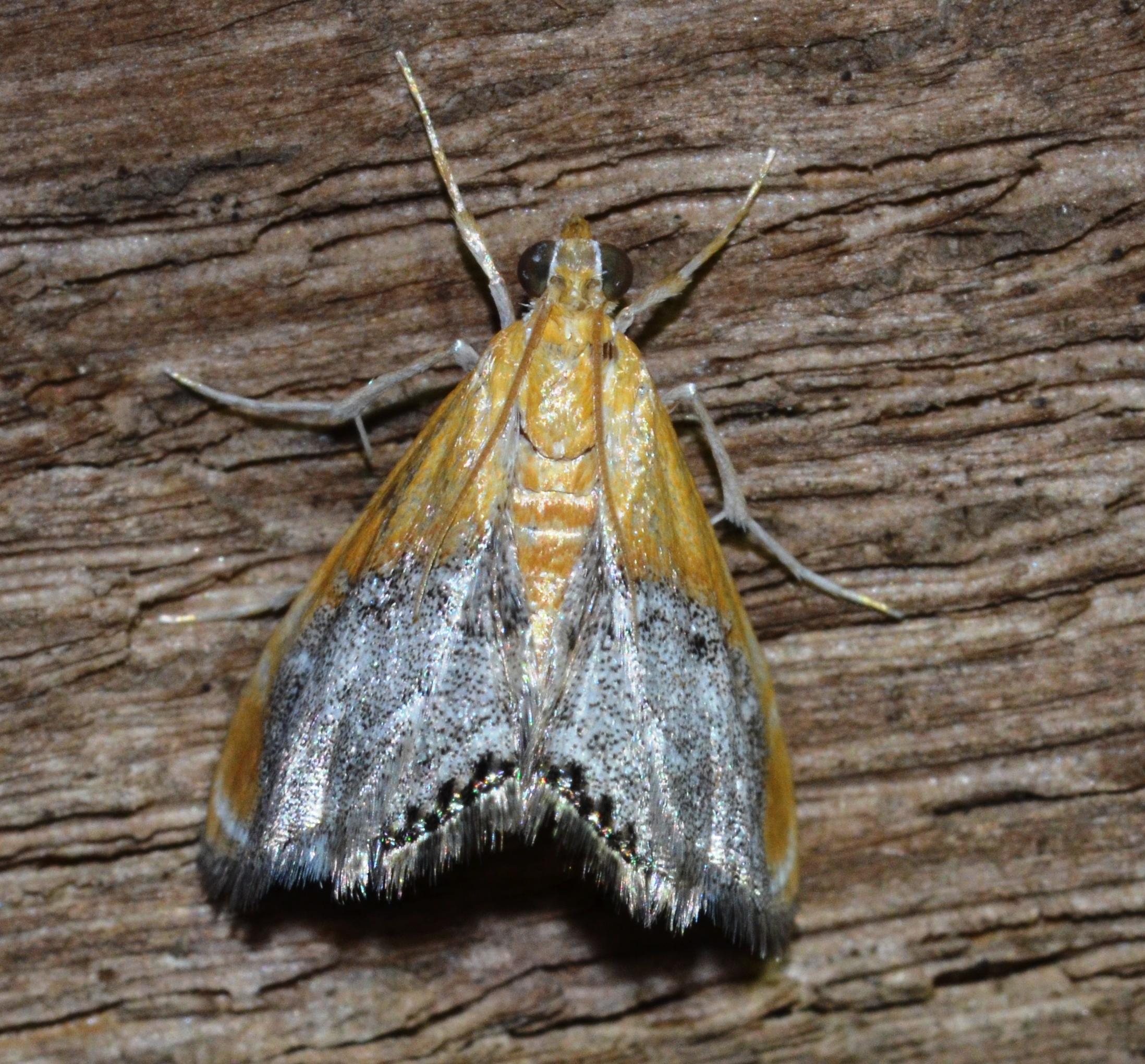

Scientific classification
- Kingdom: Animalia
- Phylum: Arthropoda
- Class: Insecta
- Order: Lepidoptera
- Family: Crambidae
- Genus: Chalcoela
- Species: C. iphitalis

Binomial name
- Chalcoela iphitalis (Walker, 1859)

Synonyms
- Cataclysta iphitalis Walker, 1859; Chalcoela aurifera Zeller, 1872

= Chalcoela iphitalis =

Sooty-winged chalcoela

Species of moth

Chalcoela iphitalis, the sooty-winged chalcoela, is a moth species of the family Crambidae that occurs throughout North America. They are seen as far south as California, Arizona and South Carolina and as far north as Ontario. Adults can be seen from May to August. The head, body and front portion of the forewings are yellow-orange while the hindwing and back portion of the forewings are grey and silver. The back edge of the hindwing has black spots.

It was first described as Cataclysta iphitalis by Francis Walker in 1859.

The larvae are parasitoids, feeding on the larvae of paper wasps, including species such as Polistes dominula, P. exclamans, P. metricus, Mischocyttarus flavitarsis and P. apachus. For example, M. flavitarsis nest cells are often invaded by the larvae at night because the wasps cannot see them. The larvae migrate among the cells, consuming wasp larvae and pupae. They will then pupate, spinning their cocoons in empty cells. M. flavitarsis do not attempt to rid the nest of the parasite. Instead, they will continue as a nest or abandon and renest elsewhere.
