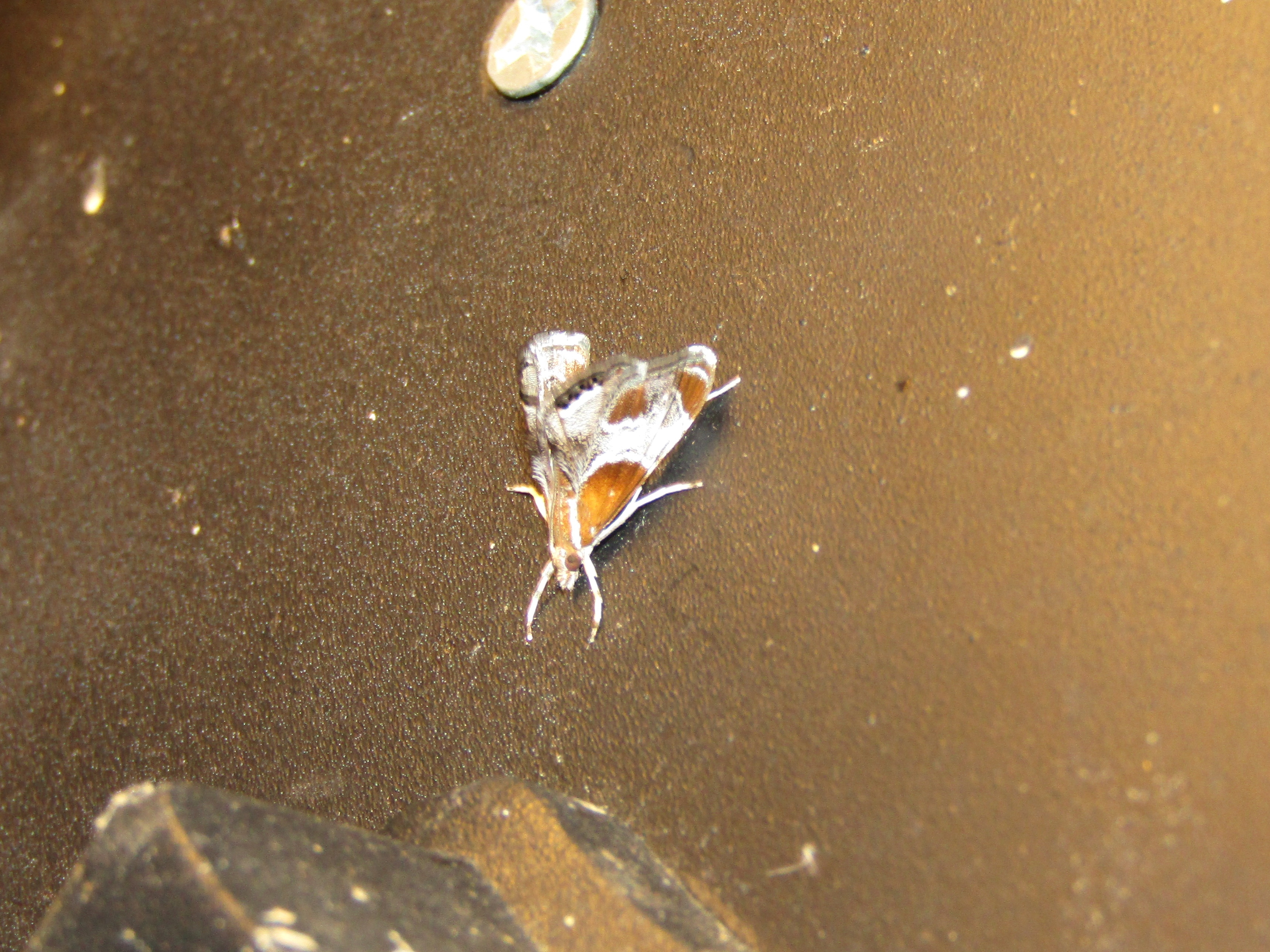

Scientific classification
- Kingdom: Animalia
- Phylum: Arthropoda
- Class: Insecta
- Order: Lepidoptera
- Family: Crambidae
- Genus: Chalcoela
- Species: C. pegasalis

Binomial name
- Chalcoela pegasalis (Walker, 1859)

Synonyms
- Cataclysta pegasalis Walker, 1859; Cataclysta egressalis Walker, 1866; Cataclysta principalis Walker, 1866; Cataclysta robinsonii Grote, 1871; Chalcoela discedalis Möschler, 1890

= Chalcoela pegasalis =

Species of moth

Chalcoela pegasalis, the wasp parasitizer moth, is a moth in the family Crambidae. It was described by Francis Walker in 1859. It is found in Cuba, Jamaica, the French Antilles, Puerto Rico and also the United States and Canada.

Adults are on wing from May to September.

The larvae are parasitoids of the larvae of Polistes species.
