= Crematogaster ashmeadi =

- Crematogaster ashmeadi worker

Scientific classification
- Domain: Eukaryota
- Kingdom: Animalia
- Phylum: Arthropoda
- Class: Insecta
- Order: Hymenoptera
- Family: Formicidae
- Subfamily: Myrmicinae
- Genus: Crematogaster
- Species: C. ashmeadi

Binomial name
- Crematogaster ashmeadi Mayr, 1886

Species of ant

Crematogaster ashmeadi, commonly known as the acrobat ant, is an arboreal ant widespread in the Southeastern United States. It nests and forages almost exclusively above ground level, often found in treetops and on lianas. It is one of eleven species in the genus Crematogaster that is native to eastern North America. This ant species has been observed to raid wasp nests, including the species Mischocyttarus mexicanus, and to forage on their brood. It is the most dominant arboreal ant in the pine forests of the coastal plains of northern Florida. Colonies of these ants inhabit a majority of pine trees in the area, living in chambers in the outer bark of living trees that have been abandoned by bark-mining caterpillars, usually of the family Cossidae. C. ashmeadi does little to no excavation of its own, relying solely on chambers bored out by other insects.
