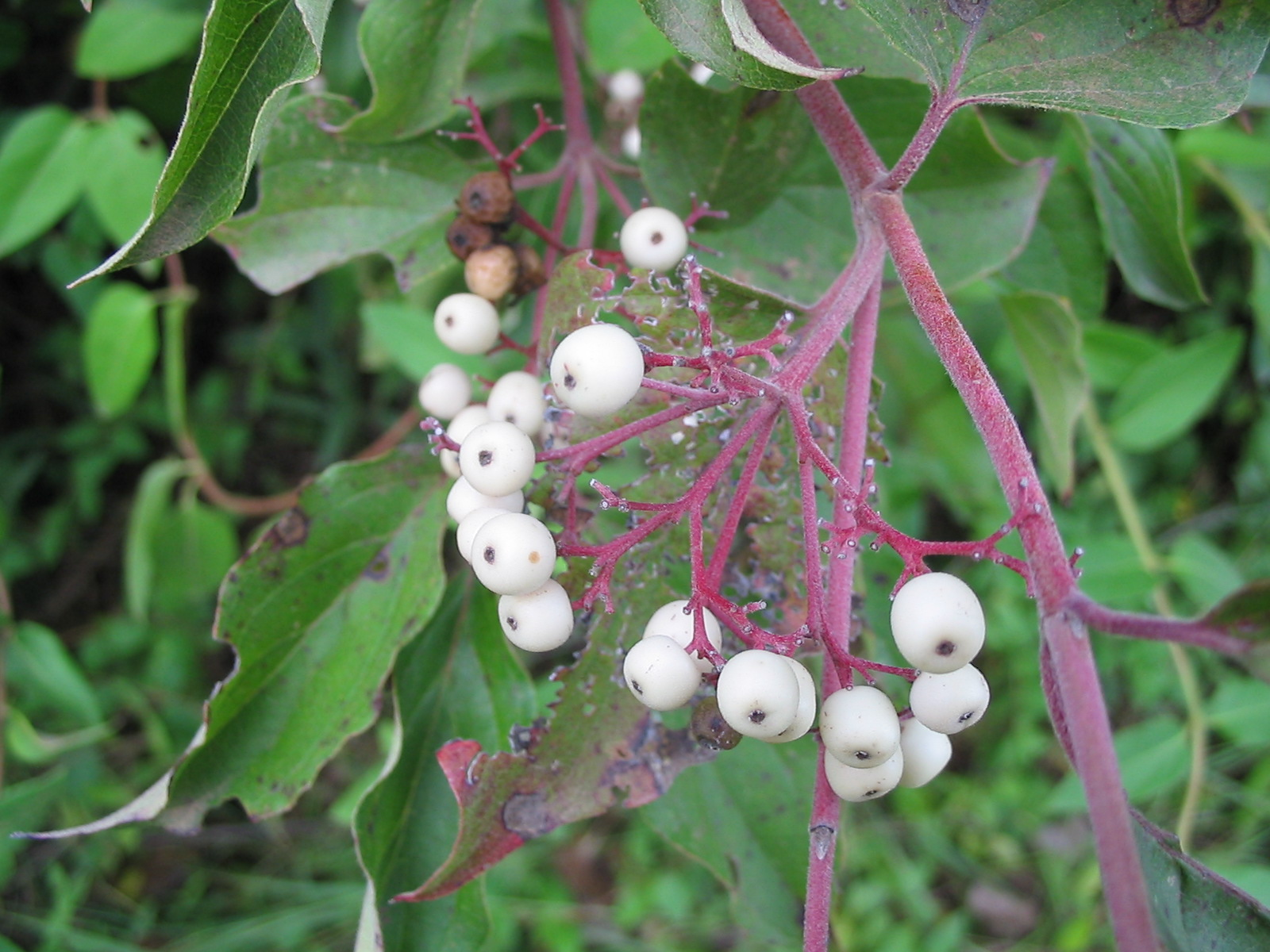
- Berries

Conservation status
- Secure (NatureServe)

Scientific classification
- Kingdom: Plantae
- Clade: Tracheophytes
- Clade: Angiosperms
- Clade: Eudicots
- Clade: Asterids
- Order: Cornales
- Family: Cornaceae
- Genus: Cornus
- Subgenus: Cornus subg. Kraniopsis
- Species: C. racemosa

Binomial name
- Cornus racemosa Lam.
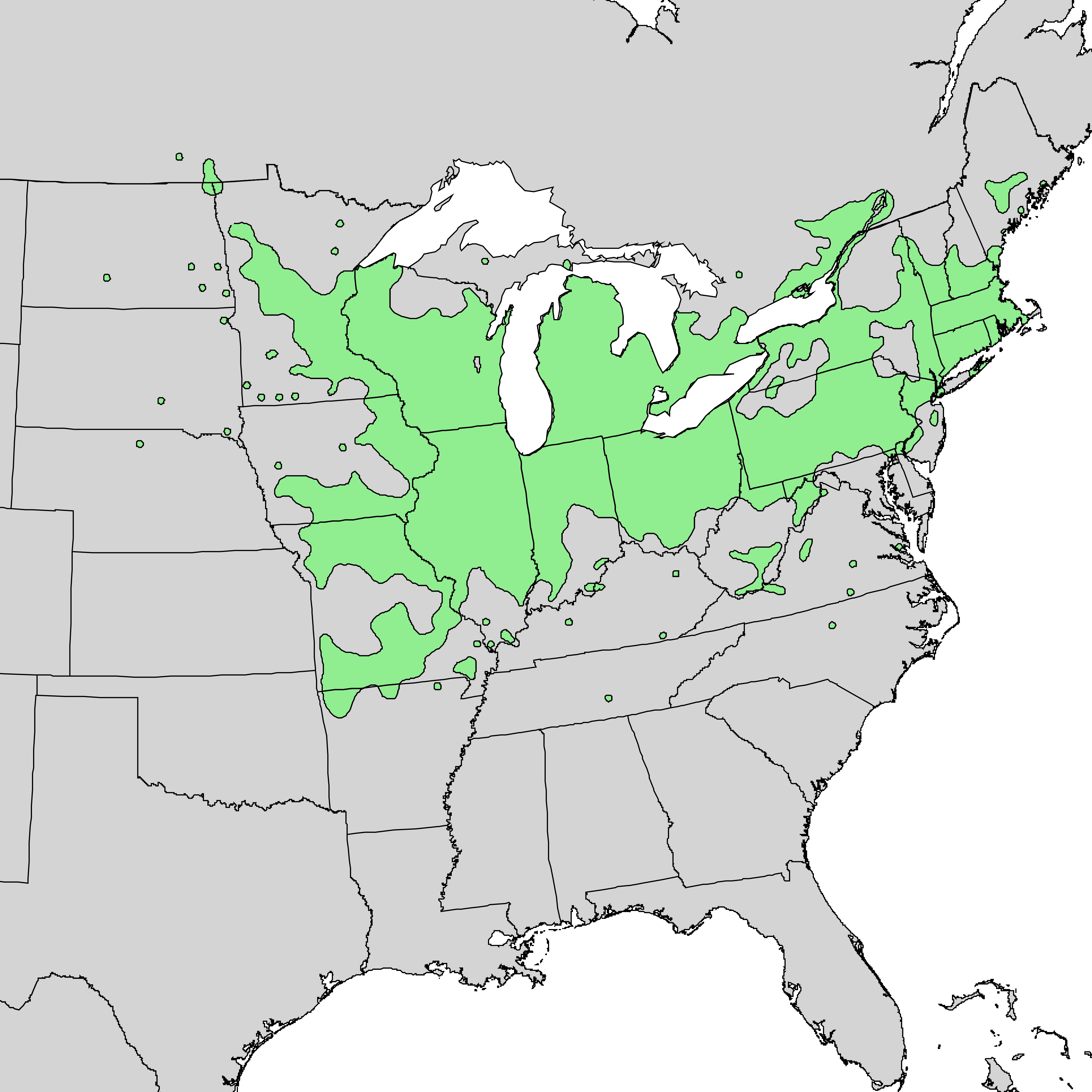
- Natural range of Cornus racemosa

Synonyms
- Cornus albida Ehrh.; Cornus comosa Raf.; Cornus foemina subsp. racemosa (Lam.) J.S.Wilson; Cornus gracilis Koehne; Cornus paniculata L'Hér.; Cornus paniculata var. albida (Ehrh.) Pursh; Cornus paniculata var. radiata Pursh; Cornus racemosa f. caeruleocarpa Oswald; Cornus racemosa f. nielsenii J.W.Moore; Swida candidissima Small; Swida gracilis (Koehne) Soják; Swida racemosa (Lam.) Moldenke; Thelycrania racemosa (Lam.) Tsitsin

= Cornus racemosa =

Species of tree

Cornus racemosa, the northern swamp dogwood, gray dogwood, or panicle dogwood, is a shrubby plant native to southeastern Canada and the northeastern United States. It is a member of the dogwood genus Cornus and the family Cornaceae.

== Description ==
Gray dogwood grows 1.2 to 3 m (4 to 10 ft) high, rarely to 8 m (26 ft). It often sends up suckers from underground rhizomes, forming thickets. Its bark is gray and its twigs have white pith. The leaves are 4–8 cm (1 1/2–3 1/4 in) long and 1–4 cm (1/2–1 1/2 in) wide, and typically have 3 or 4 pairs of lateral veins, fewer than other dogwood species. The plant grows upright with a rounded habit, oppositely arranged leaves, and terminally born flowers. The white flowers are small, with four petals 2.3 to 3 mm (0.091 to 0.118 in) long, and clustered together in rounded clusters 2.5 to 5 cm (1 to 2 in) wide called diachasial cymes, produced sometime between May and July. After flowering, green fruits (drupes) are produced, and they ripen and turn white from August to October. The flowers and fruit are attached to the plant by bright red pedicels. Many species of birds feed on the fruits. Old branches grow slowly, while new stems are fast growing. In the fall the foliage can take on a reddish or purplish color, though it is not overly showy from a distance.

== Classification ==
Cornus racemosa has been variably treated as a subspecies of Cornus foemina Mill., with which it overlaps.

It occasionally hybridizes with Cornus amomum (silky dogwood), the products of which are named Cornus × arnoldiana.
