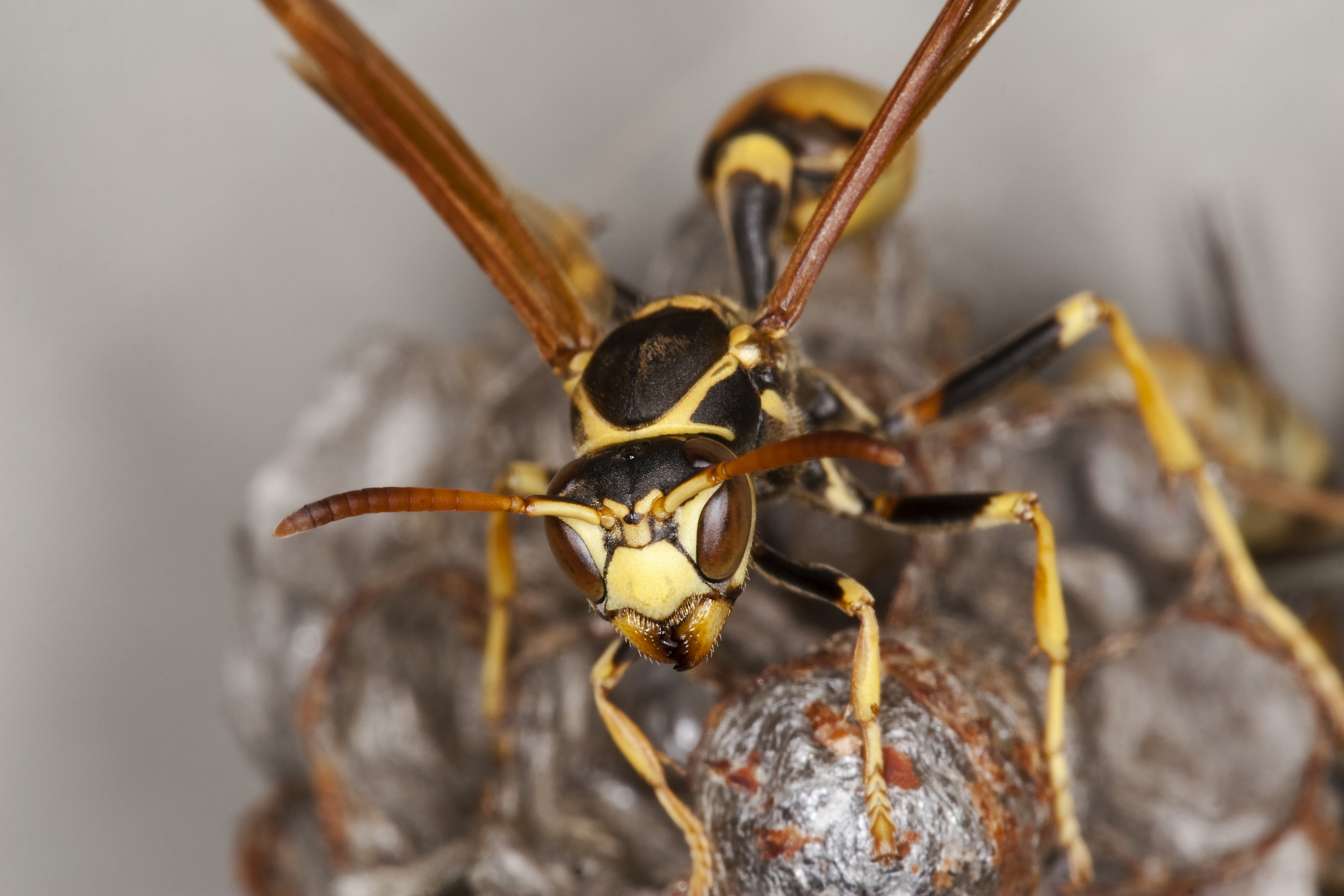

Scientific classification
- Kingdom: Animalia
- Phylum: Arthropoda
- Class: Insecta
- Order: Hymenoptera
- Family: Vespidae
- Subfamily: Polistinae
- Genus: Mischocyttarus
- Species: M. flavitarsis

Binomial name
- Mischocyttarus flavitarsis (Saussure, 1854)

= Mischocyttarus flavitarsis =

Species of wasp

Mischocyttarus flavitarsis is a social paper wasp found in western North America. Their nests can be found both in forests close to rivers or in close proximity to human life under the eaves of roofs. Despite the fact that M. flavitarsis nests are frequently in close contact with humans, M. flavitarsis typically will not sting, but rather ram into the threatening individual. Their colony cycle typically begins before May and will last until October. The queen will then seek a hibernation site for the winter. Perched near female hibernation sites are males with whom the female will mate. The males have claimed their territory by rubbing sternal brushes along the border of the site, leaving a chemical that deters other individuals from approaching. M. flavitarsis feed on arthropods, nectar, and animal carcasses and are often prey to birds, ants, and praying mantis.

== Taxonomy and phylogenetics ==
Henri Louis Frédéric de Saussure, a Swiss mineralogist and entomologist, classified M. flavitarsis in 1854. The genus Mischocyttarus is the only genus in the tribe Mischocyttarini and is the second largest genus of social wasps. Mischocyttarus species are recognizable by the internal and external lobes of the tarsal segments. Additionally, mature larvae have an appendix-like process on their first abdominal sternum.

== Description and identification ==
=== Species ===
Paper wasps typically have long and slender bodies with trailing hind legs. The color of their body is generally brownish. Specifically, M. flavitarsis is divided into five races based on coloration.

=== Nest ===
The nests of M. flavitarsis often hang from a 2–3 mm pedicle and are symmetrically round under the stem. Although rare, nests have been observed to be asymmetrically oblong or built on a vertical wall. The cells are sloping combs, and there are typically fewer than 300 cells per nest, making a relatively small nest per colony.

== Distribution and habitat ==
M. flavitarsis is found in the western United States and Canada, ranging from southern California to British Columbia. Typically, the wasps build nests in riparian forests at elevations of 1500 to 2700 meters. At lower elevations, the nests are located in deciduous and hard evergreens, and at higher elevations in conifers. Nests are typically found within 50 meters of rivers. M. flavitarsis is also known to nest in the built environment, particularly in protected spaces such as wall voids, the underside of eaves, etc.

== Colony cycle ==
=== Pre-emergence ===
Following hibernation, nests will be initiated between March and May by one or two foundresses or queens. During this period, cell construction is high as queens are laying eggs at a rate of 0.5 eggs per day. Construction by the queen slows down once eggs begin to hatch, but will increase again when pupae appear. If there are two foundresses for the colony, then one becomes the dominant egg-layer and leaves the nest less frequently than the other. Typically, the dominant queen will eat the eggs laid by the other foundress.

=== Emergence phase ===
Adults will begin to emerge about 60 days after eggs have been laid. Egg, larvae, and pupae stages each take around 20 days to complete development. Early emerging daughters help to construct the natal nest by building it larger and strengthening the stem from which it hangs. They also help to fan the brood to keep it cool and defend the nest against predators. After the adults are 10–15 days old, they begin to forage for fiber, arthropods, and nectar. A queen continues to forage through this stage but will leave the nest more rarely as adults emerge. If queens do leave the nest, it is typically only for construction materials for the nest.

=== Colony termination ===
Foraging for the nest continues through August, and the adults that emerge at this time are typically males and non-worker females. However, egg-laying begins to slow down as temperatures begin to drop. The nest will be abandoned by M. flavitarsis between September and November as the females begin to seek shelter for hibernation.

== Behavior ==
=== Dominance hierarchy ===
Female M. flavitarsis are capable of laying eggs, so dominance among females is established through physical attacks and oophagy. The dominant female becomes queen and will eat the eggs of subordinates on the same day they are laid to direct reproduction.

=== Mating behavior ===
During the summer season, males can be found in female foraging areas attempting to mate. However, as fall approaches, males will begin to set up leks near female hibernation sites. Fall mating occurs during September and October. Males will choose perch sites near areas frequented by females, sometimes changing sites up to 3 times per day. However, after six to seven days of waiting, the male will then remain at his perch site for the rest of the 6–7 weeks of mating. Once a site is chosen, the male will drag his abdomen along the surface of the perch site for scent marking.

When a female comes to mate, she lands on the perch site. The male will then either lunge or walk slowly toward the female. The male mounts the female for approximately 8 seconds and extends its curled antennae and draws the female antennae upward in a behavior called lassoing. Following mating, females will walk over the surface of the perch site, dragging their abdomens, before flying off.

==== Male defense of perch site ====
When another wasp attempts to land on an occupied perch site, the owner is alerted to the intruder. If the intruder does not fly away right away, then the owner will lunge and grapple the other wasp. Typically the two wasps will fight on the perch site and often fall off the site and land on the ground to finish fighting. Following the fight, the owner returns to its perch site, and again, rubs its abdomen to secrete its scent and ward off future intruders.

=== Nest usurpation ===
A common practice of M. flavitarsis is nest usurpation, in which the queen is displaced by a subordinate daughter or foreign wasp, which will then become the queen of the colony. The replacement queen is defined as whoever becomes the primary egg-layer in the nest. Typically, nest usurpation takes place during the pre-emergence phase or early emergence phase because there are fewer adult wasps to deter the usurper. Attempts occur because the queen is away from the nest and disappears, or there is only one foundress to overthrow. When a usurper attacks, the two wasps fight by biting, using antennation, and grappling each other attempting to sting each other. If the queen is usurped, then sometimes the older daughters will follow the queen when she flees to start a new nest. Daughters that hatch following usurpation will work for the usurper-queen.

=== Foraging ===
M. flavitarsis will often forage along a stream in search of plant fibers to construct their nest, arthropods and nectar for feeding, and water for cooling the nest. Time spent away from the nest during foraging varies depending on what the wasp is looking for. When looking for pulp, a wasp will spend about 5 minutes away from the nest. A wasp searches for arthropods and nectar for about 15 minutes. Typically in the early stages of the nest when there are fewer adult wasps, they are away from the nest for a shorter amount of time.

=== Prey detection ===
M. flavitarsis wasps are generalist predators, meaning their cues come from the many different insects and plants they feed on. Therefore, they use both visual and olfactory cues to find their prey.

==== Visual cues ====
It has been found that M. flavitarsis wasps often use visual cues to locate their prey on leaves. Often, the larvae of caterpillars will be eaten by M. flavitarsis if they are on a damaged plant leaf. A leaf that is partially eaten by a caterpillar attracts the wasps due to its irregular shape. The wasp is more likely to approach a damaged leave with holes in the middle of the leaf rather than along the edge.

==== Olfactory cues ====
M. flavitarsis wasps also locate prey by smell. In one study, holes were made in a leaf and placed near a plant that had holes made in its leaves twelve days prior. Once caterpillar larvae were placed on the leaf, the time for the wasp to locate the larvae was recorded. It was found that M. flavitarsis are more likely to approach the freshly damaged leaf, which release mechanical odors that serve as cues for the wasps. In studies, these wasps are more likely to approach a leaf based on olfactory cues, rather than visual cues. This shows that presented olfactory stimuli are processed before the wasp processes visual stimuli.

=== Glandular influences ===
Male M. flavitarsis have larger sixth, seventh, and eighth sternal glands than other wasps, suggesting a role in secretion and possible sexual attractant. Secretion is suggested because the wasps will often rub their abdomens along the nest, spreading a highly repellant substance to deter ants. The use of secretion is also used by males when trying to attract a female because they will rub their abdomen along the perimeter of their perching territory. Near the openings of the glands are sternal brushes, which assist in rubbing the secreted substance along the surface. Sternal brushes occur only in the M. flavitarsis of the Mischocyttarus genus.

=== Hibernation ===
Due to the relatively cool and dry climate in which M. flavitarsis lives, it is the only species in the Mischocyttarus genus to hibernate and will seek shelter for the duration of the months of October through April. Typically, only female wasps will hibernate, with male wasps rarely being observed during the hibernation season. Female wasps will hibernate in cracks in eaves and roofs, cavities in electric light boxes, loose bark, logs, rocks, boxes, and attics. Rarely, females will emerge on warm winter days to fly in the sun before returning to hibernate for the duration of winter.

=== Differences in male and female behavior ===
Typically, female M. flavitarsis will remain with its nest for the duration of their life. On the other hand, males remain on the natal nest for only a few days. Following departure from the colony, they spend the rest of their lives attempting to attract a mate.

== Interaction with other species ==
=== Diet ===
M. flavitarsis forage for arthropods like flies and caterpillars to feed to larvae. They will also feed upon fresh meat and hides of animals or fish. Adult wasps will drink nectar for themselves, to feed to larvae, or to store in cells.

=== Predators ===
Birds such as flickers, acorn woodpeckers, Mexican jays, and flycatchers are typical predators of M. flavitarsis. In addition to birds, ants will often try to invade the wasp nests. The wasps fight back by attempting to drive and throw the ants off the nest. They will also rub their abdomen on nest surfaces to deter ants from approaching. One final predator of M. flavitarsis is the praying mantis, which will eat perching males during mating season.

=== Defense ===
The defensive behavior of M. flavitarsis is dependent on which phase the colony cycle is in. If the nest is in the emergence phase or later, M. flavitarsis are more likely to sting a predator or intruder as a form of altruistic suicide because of colony size. However, typically the species is less prone to attack and will opt to ram the attacker as if to frighten it. When disturbed, M. flavitarsis will stand high on their mid and hind legs with their forelegs and abdomen raised and antennae forward. They then show displeasure by buzzing their wings to produce a sound audible from several meters away.

=== Parasites ===
M. flavitarsis nests are often invaded by moths (Chalcoela iphitalis) at night because the wasps cannot see them. The moths migrate among the cells consuming wasp larvae and pupae. They will then lay their larvae, which spin cocoons in empty cells. M. flavitarsis do not attempt to rid the nest of the parasite. Instead, they will continue as a nest or abandon and renest elsewhere.
