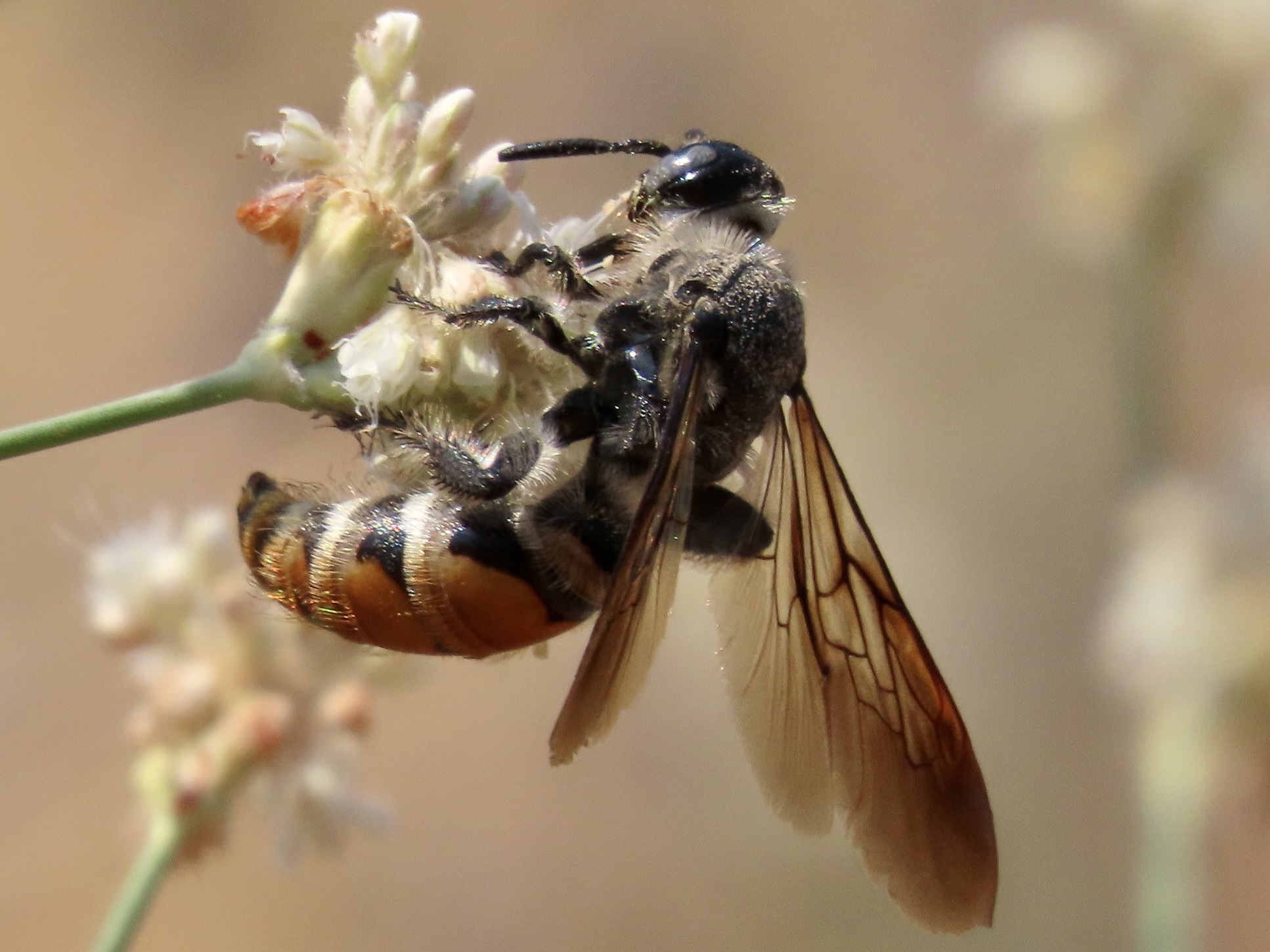
- Female in Contra Costa County, California feeding on naked buckwheat
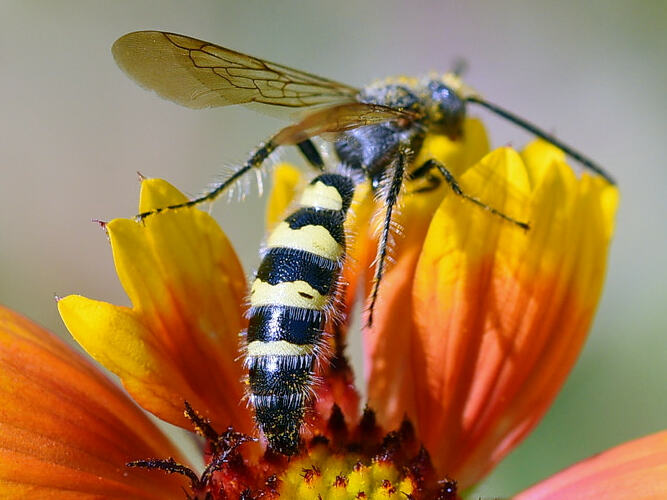
- Male in Los Angeles County, California, feeding on Gaillardia

Scientific classification
- Kingdom: Animalia
- Phylum: Arthropoda
- Clade: Pancrustacea
- Class: Insecta
- Order: Hymenoptera
- Family: Scoliidae
- Genus: Dielis
- Species: D. tolteca

Binomial name
- Dielis tolteca (Sassure, 1857)

Synonyms
- Campsomeris tolteca (Saussure, 1857); Elis tolteca Saussure, 1857

= Dielis tolteca =

Toltec scoliid wasp

Species of wasp

Dielis tolteca, the Toltec scoliid wasp, is a species of hymenopteran in the family Scoliidae. It is commonly found on plants in the genus Solidago.

== Description and identification ==
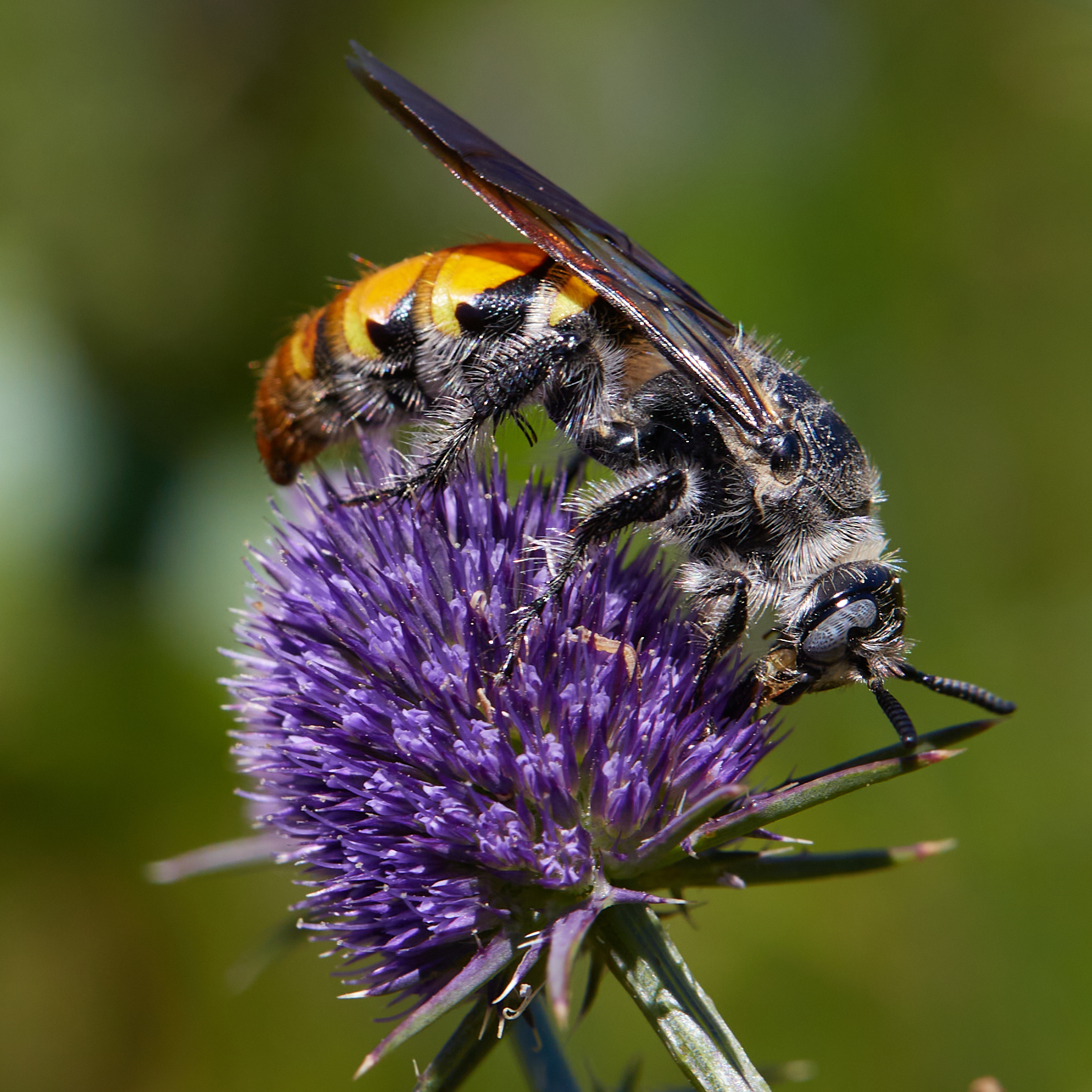
Female in California. Feeding on beethistle.

Female D. tolteca have extensive orange on at least three tergites of the gaster. The first segment is variable from a complete band to no band at all, and every possible degree in between. The only other orange-marked ally, D. dorsata, has the orange restricted to the second and third tergites of the gaster.

Male D. tolteca have four pale yellow bands on both the tergites and sternites of the gaster and a yellow band on the pronotum. As with the females, the most similar species is D. dorsata, which has sparser setae on the external valve of the penis and lacks banding on the sternites. The males further share the paler markings with D. plumipes, a species that is sympatric in Texas and which has the clypeus and pronotum entirely black. Another ally, D. pilipes, has a fifth band on the abdomen (only shared with D. tejensis) and is structurally distinct from all other members of the genus by the microstructuring on the frons, propodeum, mesonotum, and hind tibiae.

== Distribution ==
D. tolteca is mainly found in the Southwestern United States and Mexico but also occurs in Haiti.
