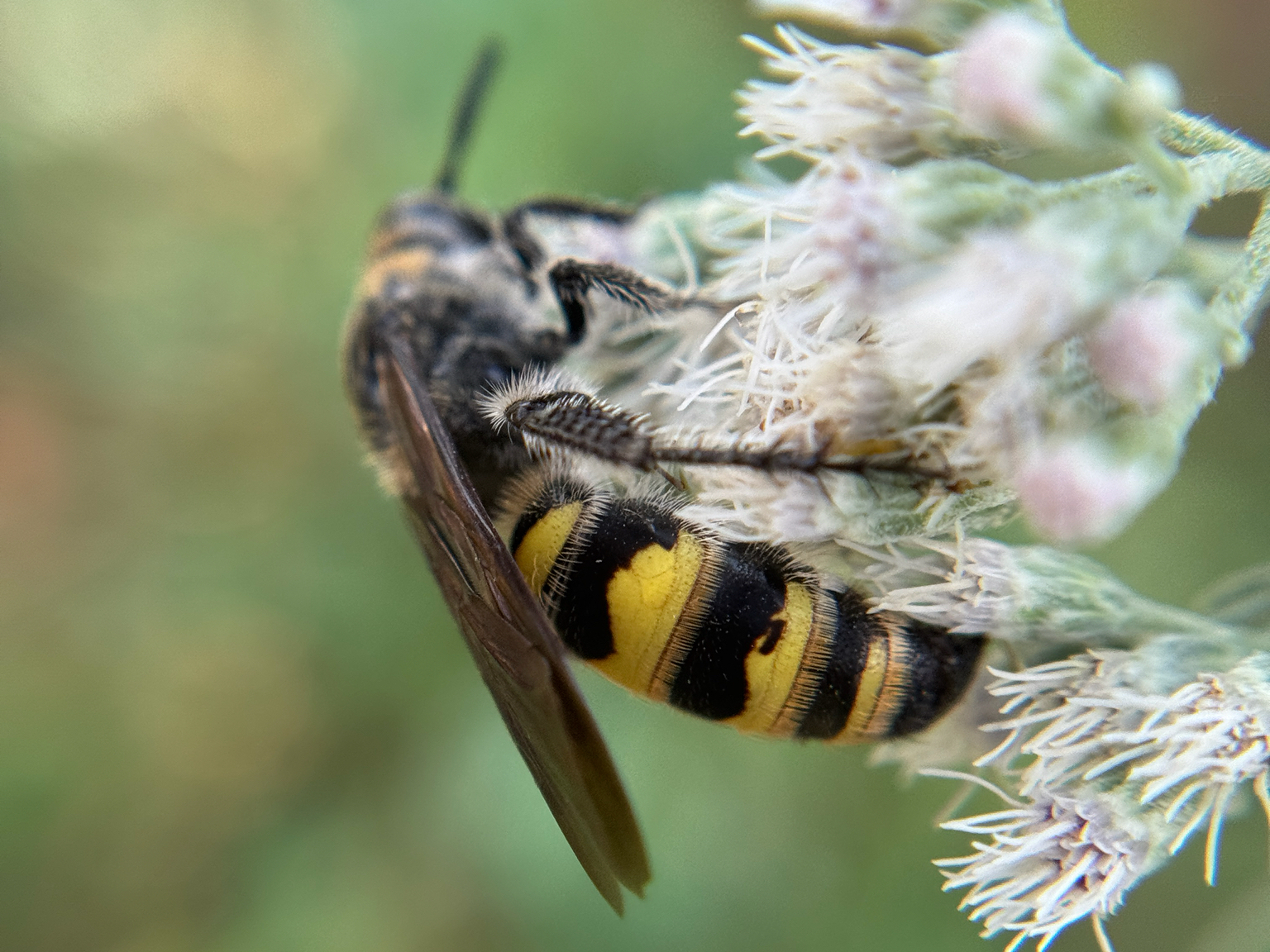
- Female Dielis tejensis in Stockdale, Texas.
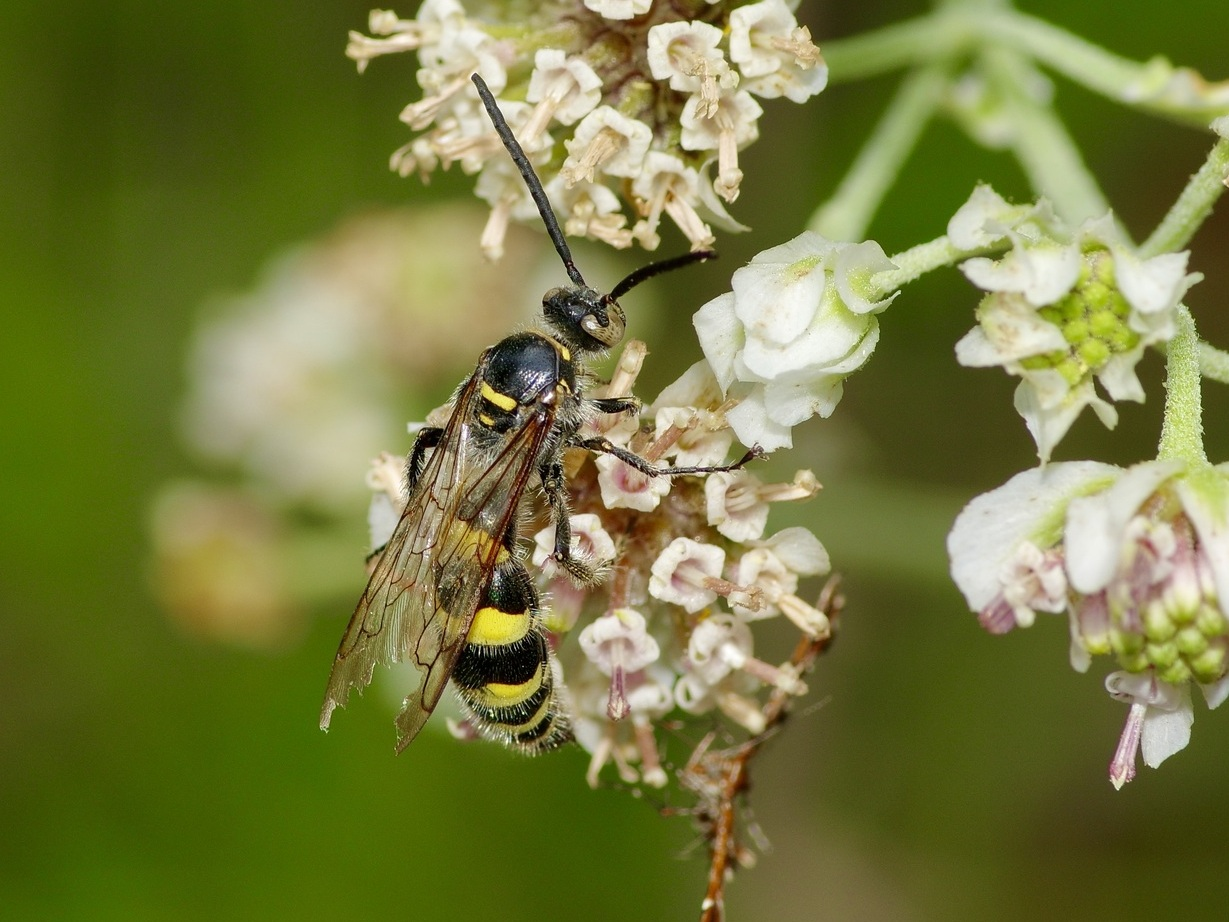
- Male Dielis tejensis seen at flower in Burleson County, Texas.

Scientific classification
- Kingdom: Animalia
- Phylum: Arthropoda
- Clade: Pancrustacea
- Class: Insecta
- Order: Hymenoptera
- Family: Scoliidae
- Genus: Dielis
- Species: D. tejensis

Binomial name
- Dielis tejensis Szafranski, 2023

= Dielis tejensis =

Species of scoliid wasp

Dielis tejensis is a species of scoliid wasp. It is endemic to Texas.

== Etymology ==
The specific epithet comes from the latinized form of "Tejas", the Spanish name for Texas.

== Description and identification ==
The species was described from male specimens in 2023 based on genetic differences to other Dielis species. It is chromatically distinguished from the males of all other North American species of the tribe Campsomerini (except for D. pillipies) by having five stripes along its abdomen rather than four. The female was described in 2026. It resembles the females of both D. plumipes confluenta and D. plumipes plumipes in coloration but differs from all other North American members of the genus in having the mesoscutum and scutellum less densely punctate.

== Biology ==
As with most species of scoliid wasps, it is thought to parasitize soil-inhabiting Scarabaeoidea beetle grubs. However, the exact host for its larva is currently unknown. Adults frequently take nectar from Hymenopappus artemisiifolius.

== Distribution ==
Dielis tejensis is currently only known from Texas from the gulf coast west to Kent county.
