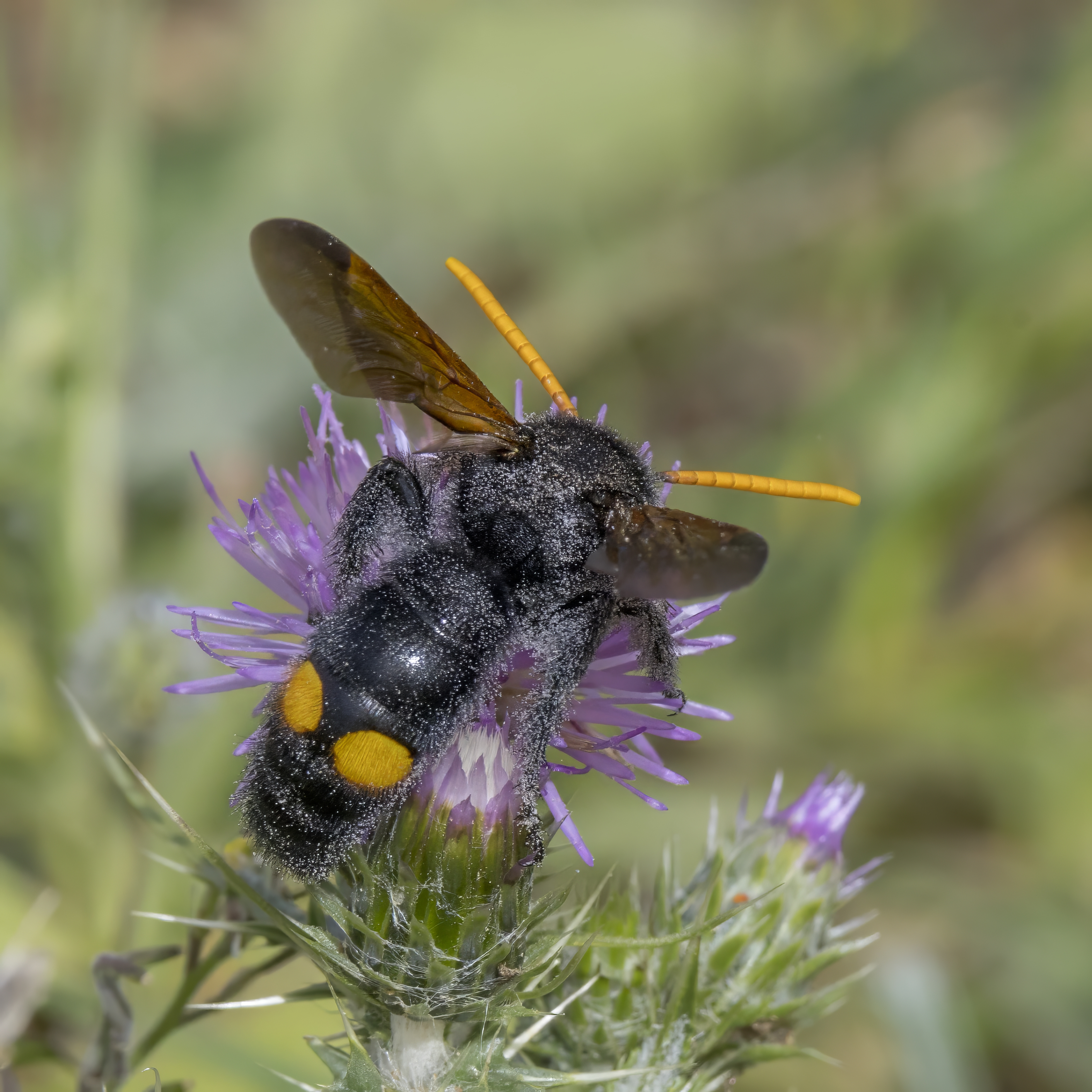
- Megascolia bidens, Tunisia

Scientific classification
- Kingdom: Animalia
- Phylum: Arthropoda
- Clade: Pancrustacea
- Class: Insecta
- Order: Hymenoptera
- Infraorder: Aculeata
- Superfamily: Scolioidea
- Family: Scoliidae; Latreille, 1802

Subfamilies
- Campsomerinae; Scoliinae; Proscoliinae †Archaeoscoliinae †Palaeoscoliinae

= Scoliidae =

Family of wasps

Scoliidae, the scoliid wasps or mammoth wasps, is a family of wasps comprising about 300 described species worldwide. They tend to be black, often marked with yellow or orange, and their wing tips are distinctively corrugated. Males are more slender and elongated than females, with significantly longer antennae, but the sexual dimorphism is not as apparent as in many of the Tiphiidae and Thynnidae.

== Biology ==
Scoliid wasps are solitary parasitoids of larvae, most frequently those of the scarab beetle. Female scoliids burrow into the ground or into rotting wood, in search of these larvae and then use their sting to paralyze them. When locating hosts, they may burrow through the soil or follow tunnels already created by scarab larvae. The females are often observed flying close to the ground while searching for scarab larvae in the soil and they sometimes excavate a chamber and move the paralyzed beetle larva into it before depositing an egg. The female lays a single egg on the paralysed grub, often attached transversely to one of the larva's abdominal segments. Scoliid wasps act as important biocontrol agents, as many of the beetles they parasitize are pests, including the Japanese beetle. Male scoliids patrol territories, ready to mate with females emerging from the ground. Adult wasps may be minor pollinators of some plants and can be found on many wildflowers in the late summer.

Scoliidae has at least one species known to engage in pseudocopulation with an orchid. Flowers of the orchid Bipinnula penicillata in subtropical South America resemble females of Pygodasis bistrimaculata, tricking male wasps into attempting to mate and, in the process, provide pollination. Scoliids include some of the largest wasps in the world, such as Megascolia procer.

== Taxonomy ==
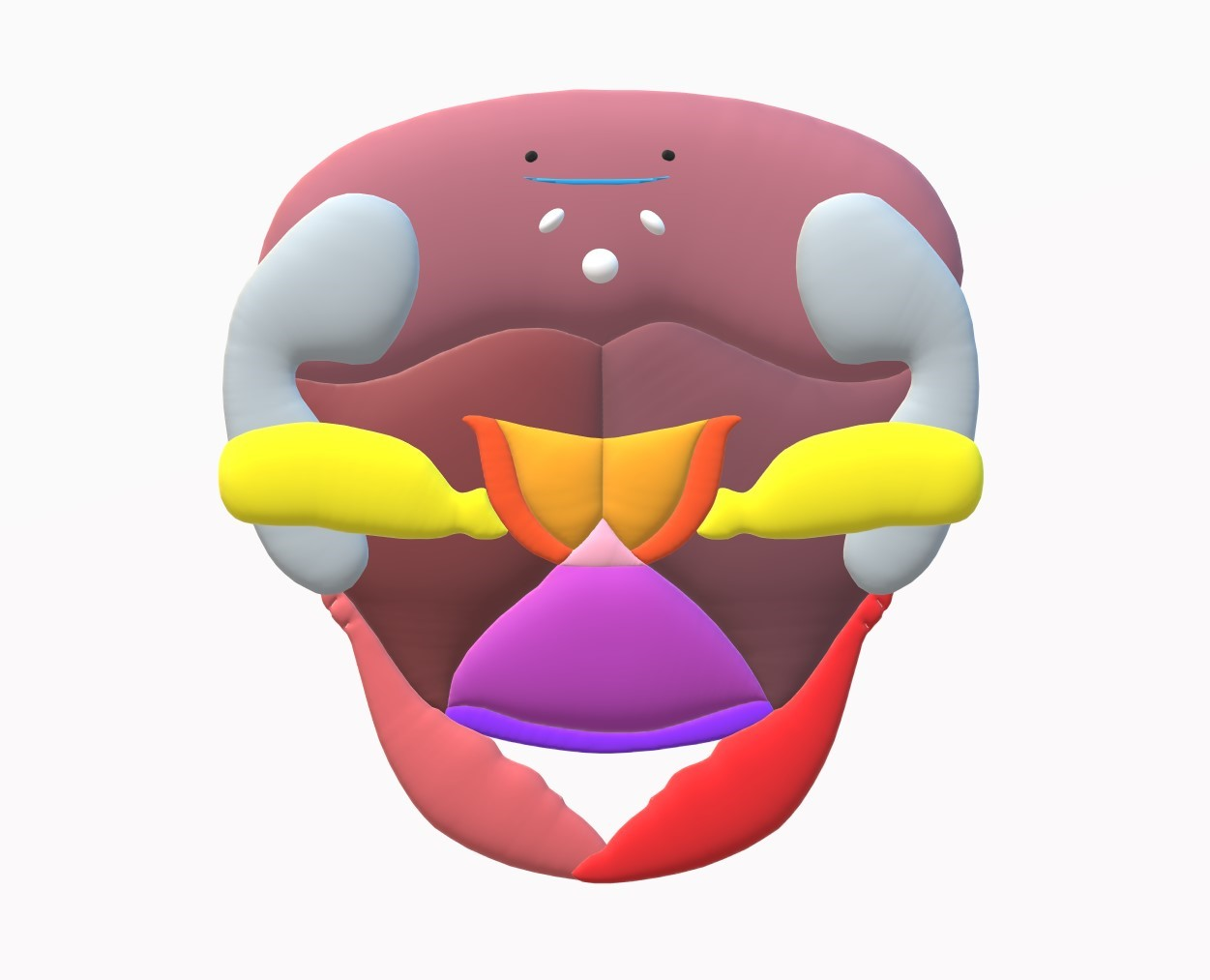
Face of a scoliid wasp in coded color, illustrating the main features: ocellar pits ocellar furrow three simple eyes two compound eyes vertex, above curved carina frontalis frons, below curved carina frontalis and bisected by fissura frontalis scrobe area frontalis clypeus anterior margin of clypeus mandibles antennal scapes lamina frontalis spatium frontale or frontal space Adapted from K. V. Krombein (1978)

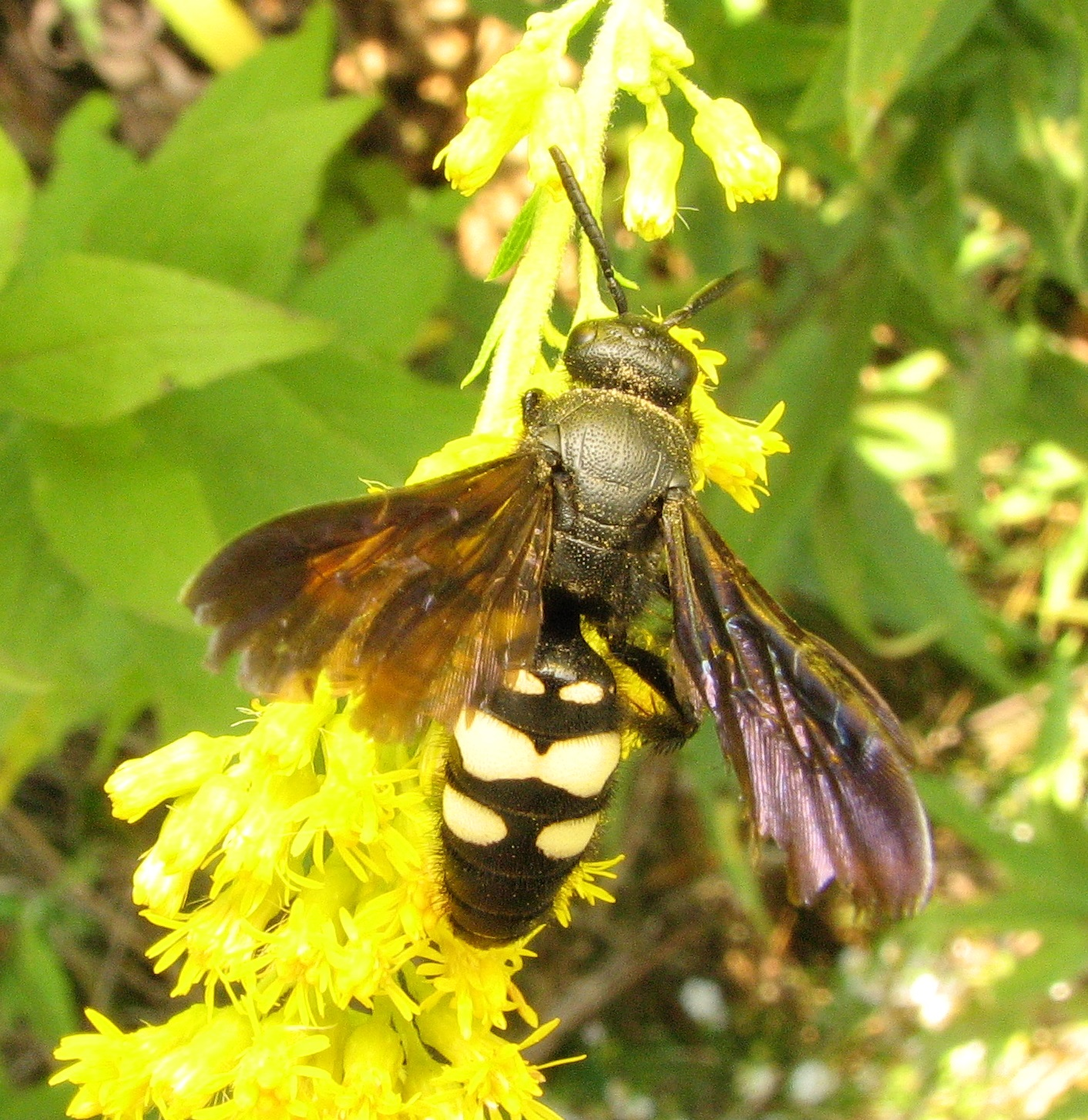
Scolia bicincta female, Pennsylvania

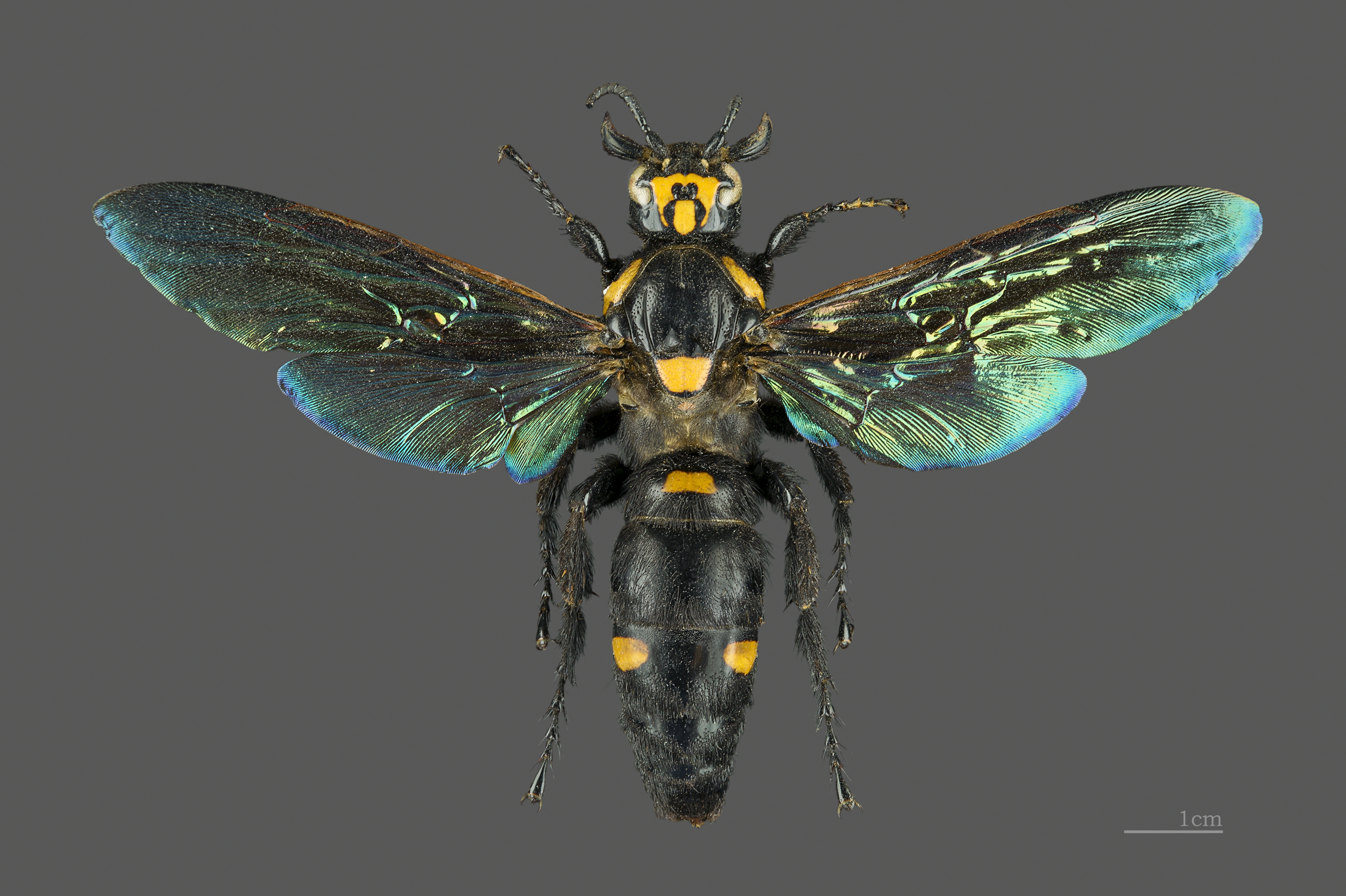
Megascolia procer, Indonesia

Living scoliidae genera are classified as follows into three subfamilies. There are additionally two subfamilies known only from the fossil record.

=== Subfamily Proscoliinae Rasnitsyn, 1977 ===
- Proscolia Rasnitsyn 1977

=== Subfamily Campsomerinae Betrem, 1972 ===
==== Tribe Campsomerini Betrem, 1972 ====
- Aelocampsomeris Bradley 1957
- Aureimeris Betrem, 1972
- Australelis Betrem, 1962
- Campsomeriella Betrem, 1941
- Campsomeris Lepeletier, 1838
- Cathimeris Betrem, 1972
- Charimeris Betrem, 1971
- Colpacampsomeris Betrem, 1967
- Dasyscolia Bradley, 1951
- Dielis Saussure & Sichel, 1864
- Extrameris Betrem, 1972
- Laevicampsomeris Betrem, 1933
- Leomeris Betrem, 1972
- Lissocampsomeris Bradley, 1957
- Megacampsomeris Betrem, 1928
- Megameris Betrem, 1967
- Micromeriella Betrem, 1972
- Peltatimeris Betrem, 1972
- Phalerimeris Betrem, 1967
- Pseudotrielis Betrem, 1928
- Pygodasis Bradley, 1957
- Radumeris Betrem, 1962
- Rhabdotomeris Bradley, 1957
- Sericocampsomeris Betrem, 1941
- Sphenocampsomeris Bradley, 1957
- Stygocampsomeris Bradley, 1957
- Tenebromeris Betrem, 1963
- Trisciloa Gribodo, 1893
- Tristimeris Betrem, 1967
- Tubatimeris Betrem, 1972
- Tureimeris Betrem, 1972
- Xanthocampsomeris Bradley, 1957

=== Subfamily Scoliinae Latreille, 1802 ===
==== Tribe Scoliini Latreille, 1802 ====
- Austroscolia Betrem, 1927
- Carinoscolia Betrem, 1927
- Diliacos Saussure & Sichel, 1864
- Laeviscolia Betrem, 1928
- Liacos Guérin-Méneville, 1838
- Megascolia Betrem, 1928
- Microscolia Betrem, 1928
- Mutilloscolia Bradley, 1959
- Pyrrhoscolia Bradley, 1957
- Scolia Fabricius 1775
- Triscolia de Saussure 1863

==== Tribe Trielidini Betrem, 1972 ====
- Colpa Dufour, 1841
- Guigliana Betrem, 1967

=== Subfamily †Archaeoscoliinae Rasnitsyn, 1993 ===
The subfamily Archaeoscoliinae is known exclusively from the fossil record, with the largest diversity having lived during the Cretaceous (Barremian) before going extinct by the late Eocene (Priabonian).

- †Archaeoscolia Rasnitsyn, 1993
  - †Archaeoscolia hispanica Rasnitsyn & Martínez-Delclòs, 1999
  - †Archaeoscolia senilis Rasnitsyn, 1993
- †Cretoscolia Rasnitsyn, 1993
  - †Cretoscolia brasiliensis Osten, 2007
  - †Cretoscolia conquensis Rasnitsyn & Martínez-Delclòs, 1999
  - †Cretoscolia formosa Zhang, 2004
  - †Cretoscolia laiyangica Zhang, 2004
  - †Cretoscolia montsecana Rasnitsyn & Martínez-Delclòs, 1999
  - †Cretoscolia patiens Rasnitsyn, 1993
  - †Cretoscolia promissiva Rasnitsyn, 1993
  - †Cretoscolia rasnitsyni Zhang, 2004
- †Floriscolia Rasnitsyn, 1993
  - †Floriscolia relicta Rasnitsyn, 1993
- †Protoscolia Zhang et al., 2002
  - †Protoscolia imperialis Zhang et al., 2002
  - †Protoscolia normalis Zhang et al., 2002
  - †Protoscolia sinensis Zhang et al., 2002

Three additional undescribed specimens from the Ypresian Eocene Okanagan Highlands were referred to the subfamily by S. Bruce Archibald et al. (2018). The two fossils from the Klondike Mountain Formation of Northeastern Washington state, and one fossil from the Allenby Formation of South central British Columbia were mentioned briefly but no specific commentary on placement or finer taxonomic detail was presented in the paper.

=== Subfamily †Palaeoscoliinae Antropov, 2014 ===
A second fossil subfamily, Palaeoscoliinae, was described from the Late Eocene to comprise a single species. This species was morphologically closer to the Scoliinae than to the Archaeoscoliinae.

- †Palaeoscolia Antropov, 2014
  - †Palaeoscolia relicta Antropov, 2014

== History ==
In 1847 and 1849 Eduard Eversmann published his "Fauna Hymenopterologica Volgo-Uralensis—exhibiting the species of Hymenoptera which he observed and described in the provinces situated between the Volga river and the Ural mountains." He placed the Scoliadae Latreille, 1802 as a subfamily of the Sphegidae Latreille, 1802. He mentioned the genus Scolia Fabricius, 1775 with 13 species, the genus Tiphia Fabricius, 1775 with 3 species, and the genus Meria Illiger, 1807, with only the species Meria sexpunctata.

== North American species list ==
There are 36 species of Scoliidae reported to occur in North America. Two additional species, Campsomeriella annulata (Fabricius, 1793) and Micromeriella marginella (Klug, 1810), were introduced to the United States but failed to become established.

- Aelocampsomeris variegata (Fabricius, 1793) – Mexico, Central America
- Campsomeris atrata (Fabricius, 1775) – Caribbean
- Campsomeris vitripennis (Smith, 1855) – Mexico, Central America
- Colpa (Colpa) octomaculata (Say, 1823) – United States, Mexico
- Colpa (Colpa) pollenifera (Viereck, 1906) – United States, Mexico
- Colpa (Crioscolia) alcione (Banks, 1917) – United States, Mexico
- Colpa (Crioscolia) flammicoma (Bradley, 1928) – United States, Mexico
- Dielis dorsata (Fabricius, 1787) – United States, Caribbean, Mexico, Central America
- Dielis pilipes (Saussure, 1858) – United States, Mexico
- Dielis plumipes (Drury, 1770) – United States
- Dielis tejensis Szafranski, 2023 – United States
- Dielis tolteca (Saussure, 1857) – United States, Mexico, Central America
- Dielis trifasciata (Fabricius, 1793) – United States, Caribbean
- Lissocampsomeris wesmaeli (Lepeletier, 1845) – Mexico, Central America
- Pygodasis ephippium (Say, 1837) – United States, Mexico, Central America
- Pygodasis hyalina (Saussure, 1864) – Mexico
- Pygodasis ianthina (Bradley, 1945) – Mexico, Central America
- Pygodasis vittata (Sichel, 1864) – Mexico, Central America
- Pygodasis quadrimaculata (Fabricus, 1775) – United States
- Rhabdotimeris rokitanskyi (Dalla Torre, 1897) – Mexico, Central America
- Scolia bicincta (Fabricius, 1775) – United States
- Scolia dubia (Say, 1837) – United States, Mexico
- Scolia fuscipennis Bartlett, 1912 – Mexico
- Scolia guttata (Burmeister, 1853) – United States, Mexico, Central America
- Scolia mexicana (Saussure, 1858) – United States, Mexico
- Scolia nobilitata (Fabricius, 1805) – United States, Mexico
- Scolia rufiventris Fabricius, 1804 – Mexico, Central America
- Scolia vintschgaui Dalla Torre, 1893 – Mexico
- Stygocampsomeris servillei (Guérin, 1838) – Mexico, Central America
- Triscolia ardens (Smith, 1855) – United States, Mexico
- Triscolia badia (Saussure, 1863) – Mexico
- Xanthocampsomeris completa (Rohwer, 1927) – United States, Mexico, Central America
- Xanthocampsomeris fulvohirta (Cresson, 1865) – United States, Caribbean
- Xanthocampsomeris hesterae (Rohwer, 1921) – United States, Mexico, Central America
- Xanthocampsomeris limosa (Burmeister, 1853) – United States, Mexico
- Xanthocampsomeris tricincta (Fabricius, 1775) – Caribbean
