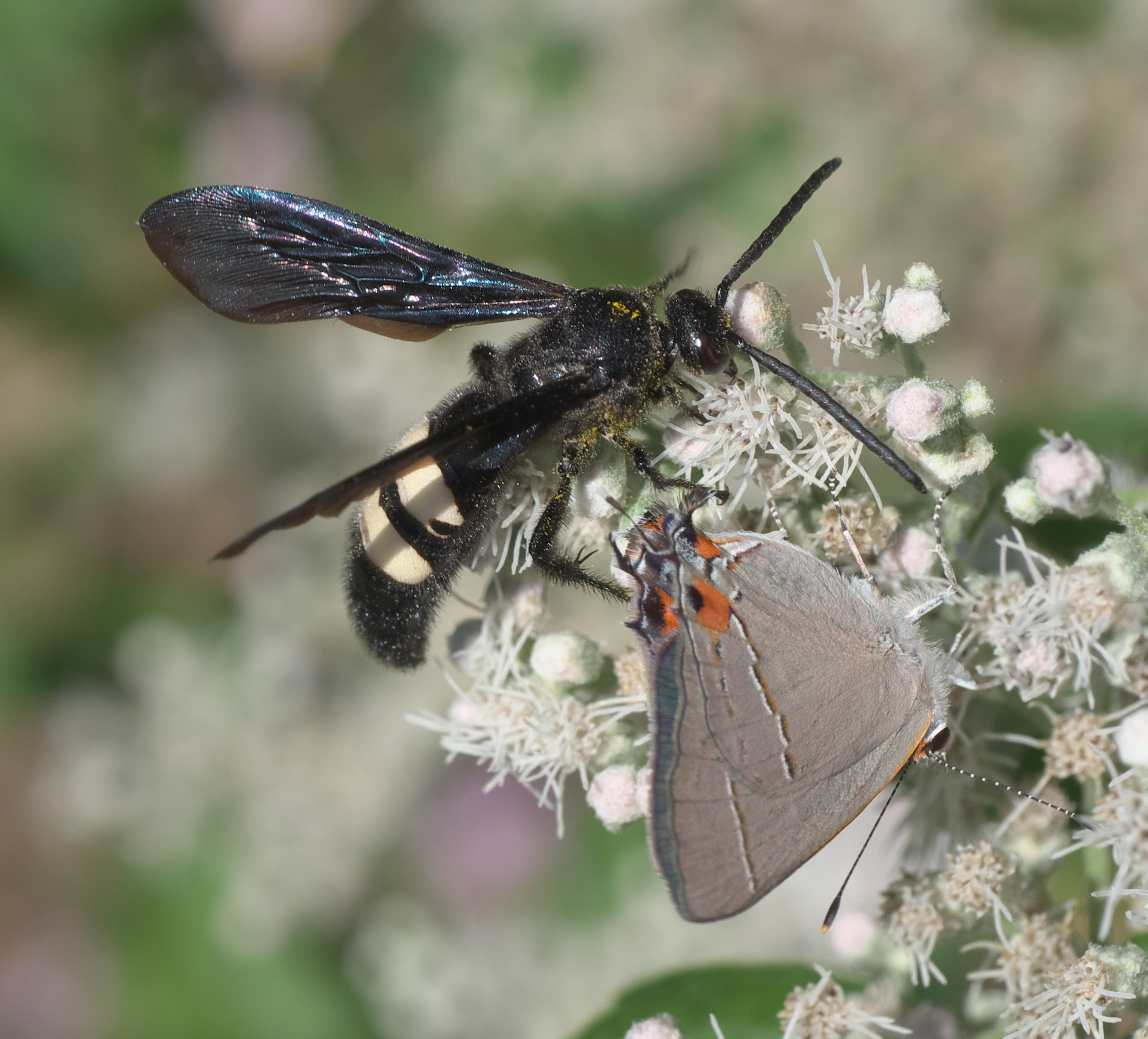

Scientific classification
- Domain: Eukaryota
- Kingdom: Animalia
- Phylum: Arthropoda
- Class: Insecta
- Order: Hymenoptera
- Family: Scoliidae
- Tribe: Scoliini
- Genus: Scolia
- Species: S. bicincta

Binomial name
- Scolia bicincta Fabricius, 1775

= Scolia bicincta =

Species of wasp

Scolia bicincta, the double-banded scoliid, is a species of scoliid wasp in the family Scoliidae.

It measures 21-25 mm. It is found in eastern and central North America. It is active in late summer.
