= Johan George Betrem =

Dutch entomologist and phytopathologist

Johan George Betrem (1899 in The Hague – 1980) was a Dutch entomologist and phytopathologist who worked in Java from 1930–1945. He is best known for his work on Scoliidae (Betrem J.G., 1928. Monographie der Indo-Australischen Scoliiden mit zoogeographischen Betrachtungen. Treubia 9 (suppl. Vol.) 388 pp., 5 pls.)
