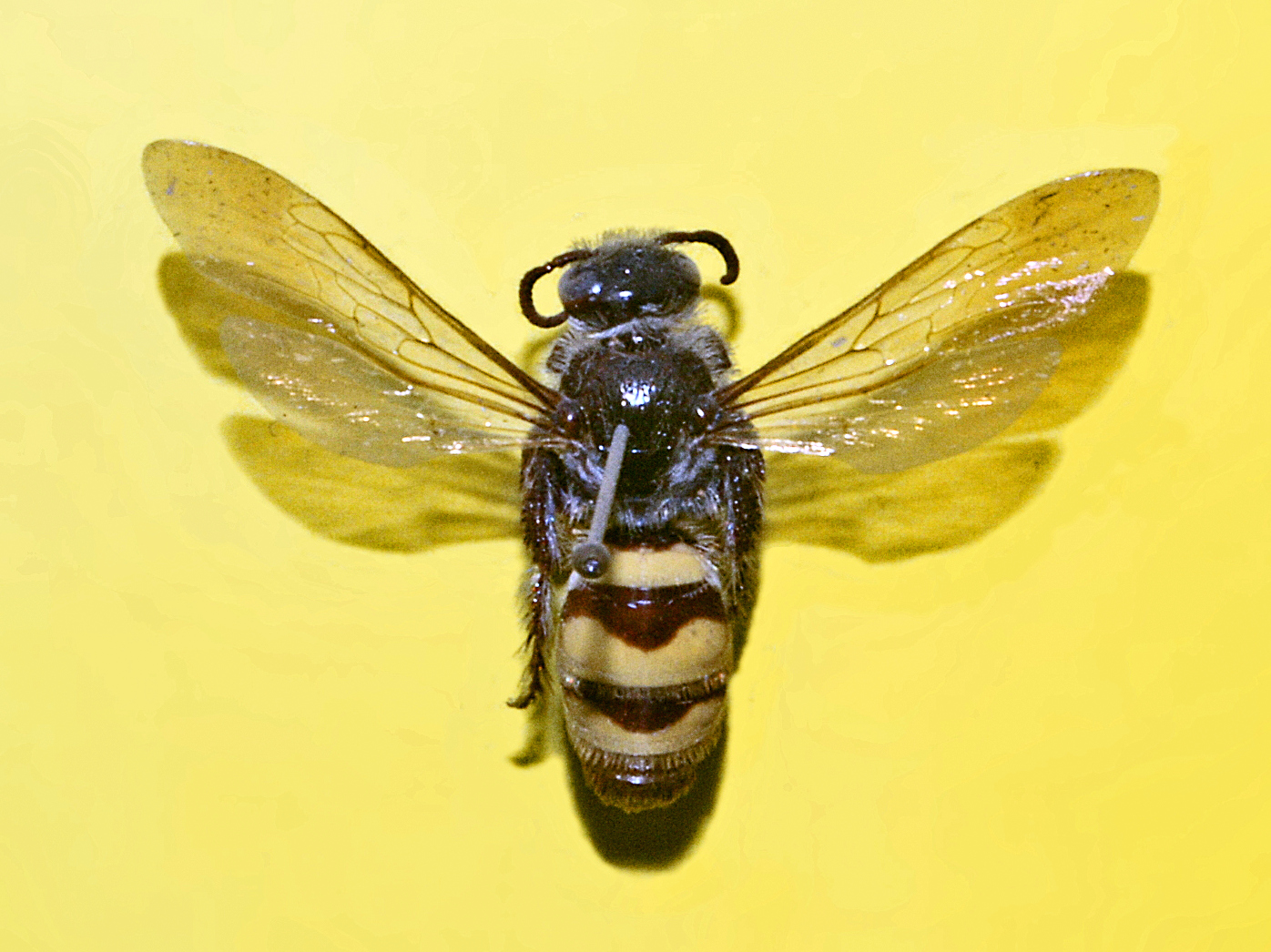
- Dielis trifasciata. Museum specimen

Scientific classification
- Kingdom: Animalia
- Phylum: Arthropoda
- Class: Insecta
- Order: Hymenoptera
- Family: Scoliidae
- Genus: Dielis
- Species: D. trifasciata

Binomial name
- Dielis trifasciata (Fabricius, 1793)

Synonyms
- Tiphia trifasciata Fabricius, 1793; Scolia trifasciata (Fabricius, 1793); Elis trifasciatus (Fabricius, 1793); Campsomeris trifasciata (Fabricius 1793); Colpa alexandri Lepeletier, 1845

= Dielis trifasciata =

Species of wasp

Dielis trifasciata, also known as the three-banded scoliid wasp, is a species in the family Scoliidae.

== Description and identification ==
Dielis trifasciata typically have a body length of 10–15 millimetres (0.39–0.59 in), though males of the subspecies D. t. nassauensis can reach up to 19 millimetres (0.75 in). The females have yellow bands on the three anterior abdominal segments. These bands are broad in the nominate subspecies, D. t. trifasciata but very narrow in the subspecies D. t. nassauensis. In males, the last three abdominal segments are black, and the scutellum has a single yellow band. The males of D. t. trifasciata are distinguished from allied species in part by the extensively yellow clypeus.

== Biology ==
These parasitic wasps lay eggs on larvae of the scarab Phyllophaga portoricensis. Adult scoliids feed on nectar and possibly pollen.

== Distribution ==
Dielis trifasciata is present in southern Florida, the Bahamas, and in most of the Greater Antilles.

== Subspecies ==
There are two subspecies of D. trifasciata:

- Dielis trifasciata nassauensis (Bradley, 1928)
- Dielis trifasciata trifasciata (Fabricius, 1793)

== Gallery ==
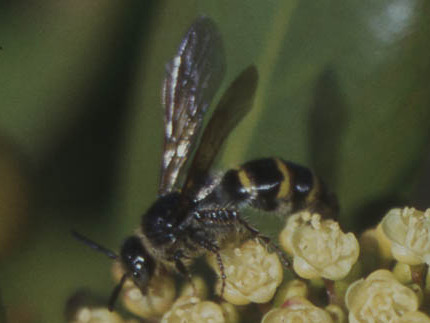
D. trifasciata nassauensis female in the Bahamas.

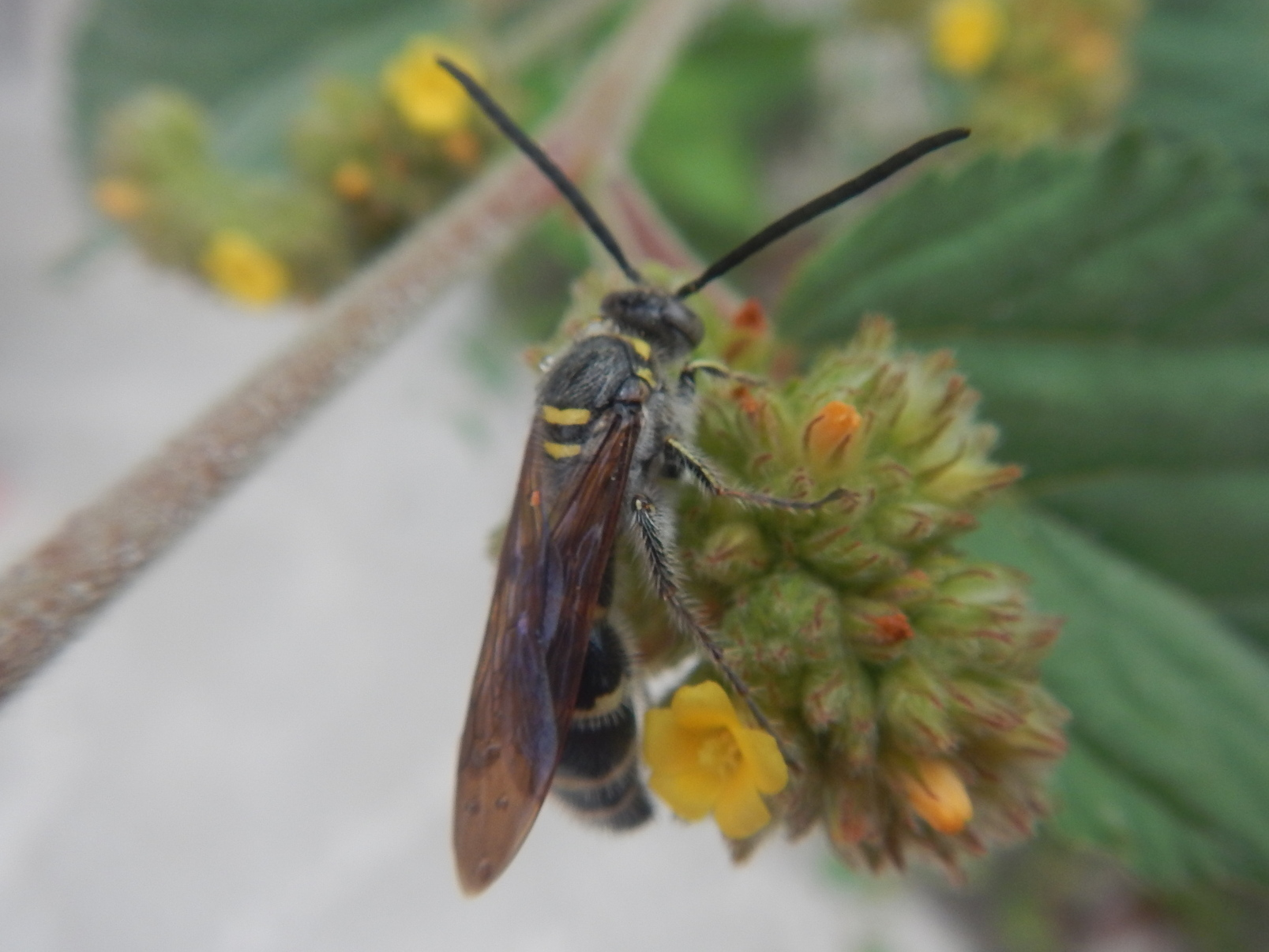
D. trifasciata nassauensis male in the Bahamas.

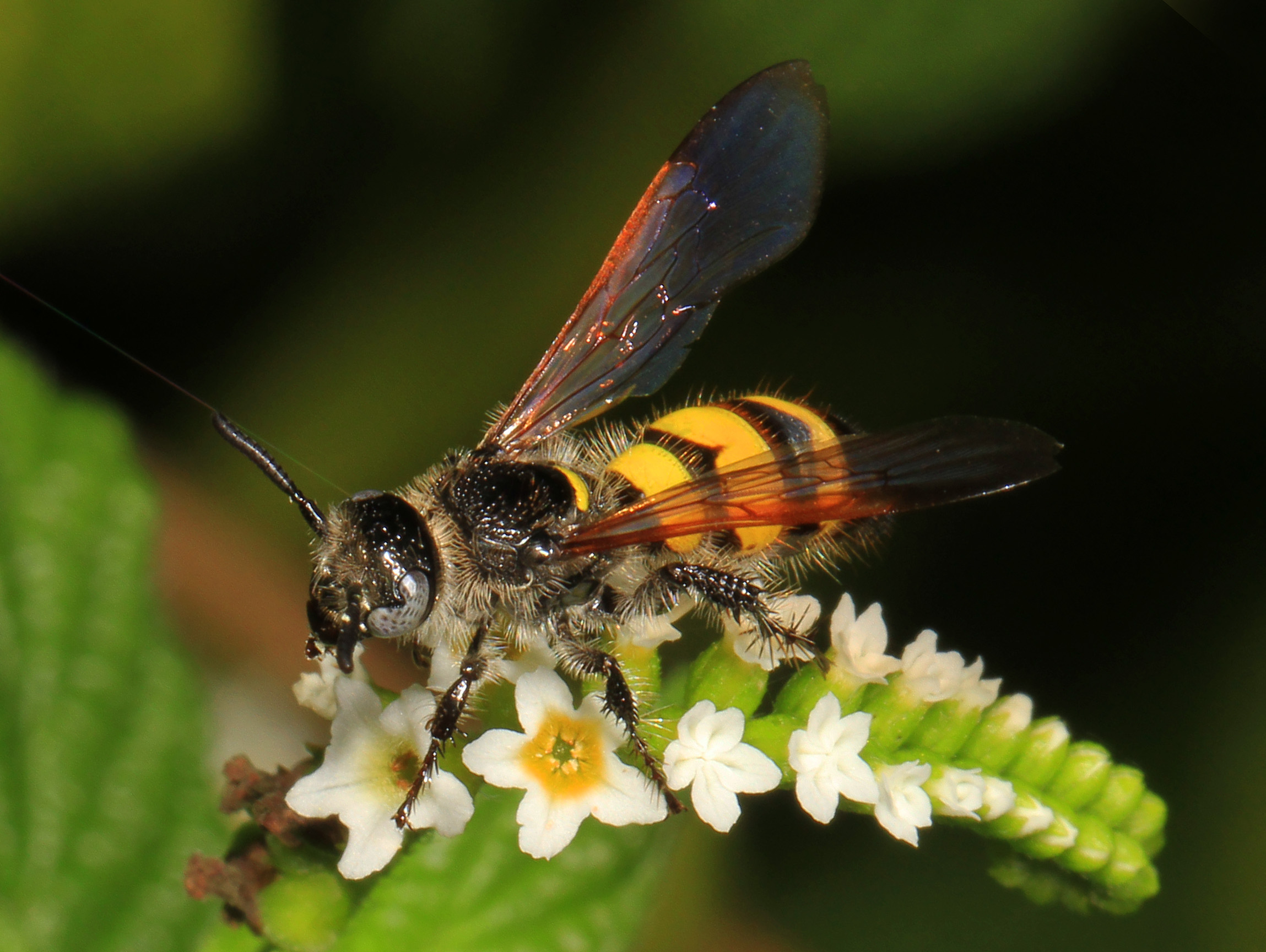
D. trifasciata trifasciata female in Florida.

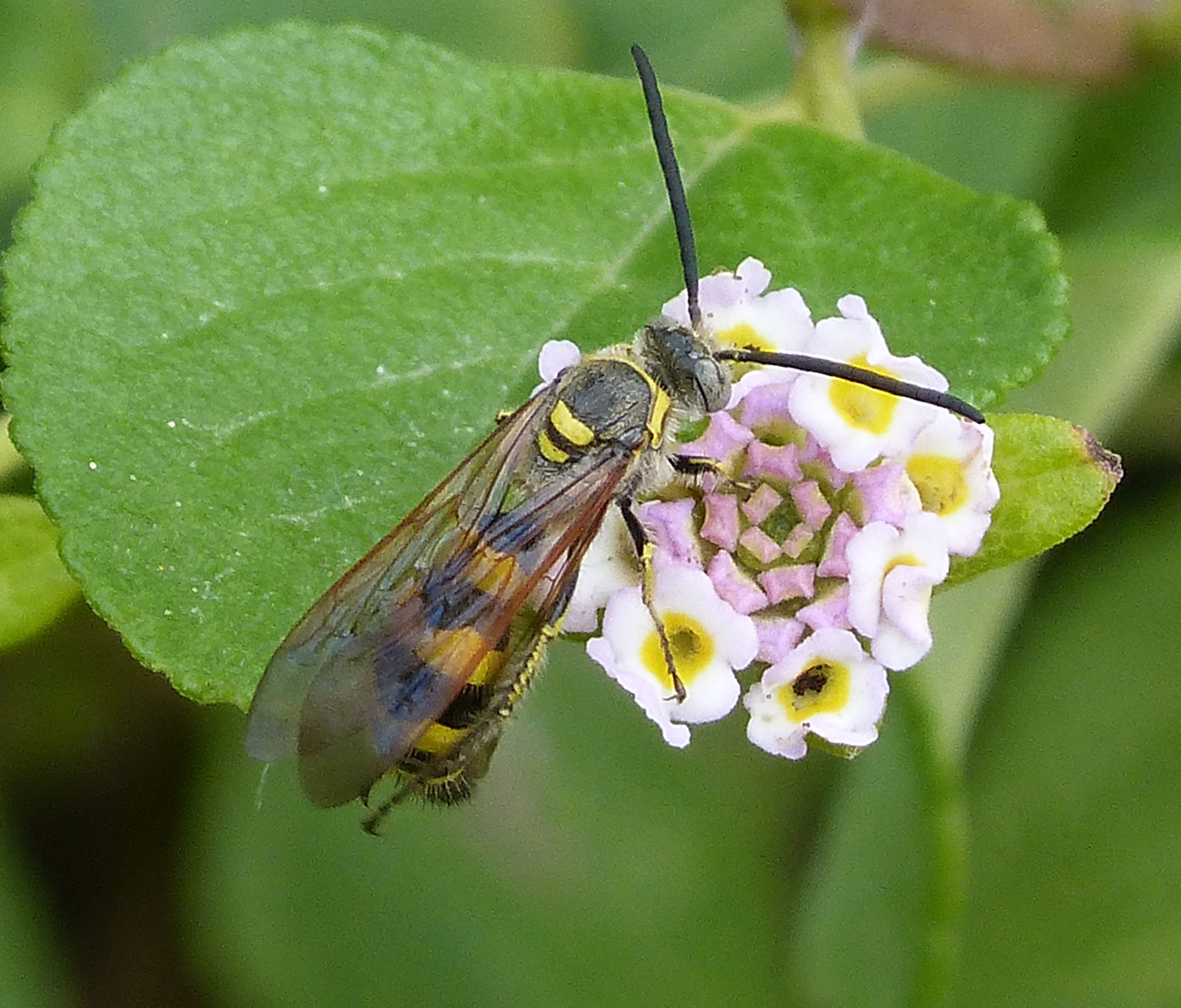
D. trifasciata trifasciata male in Cuba.
