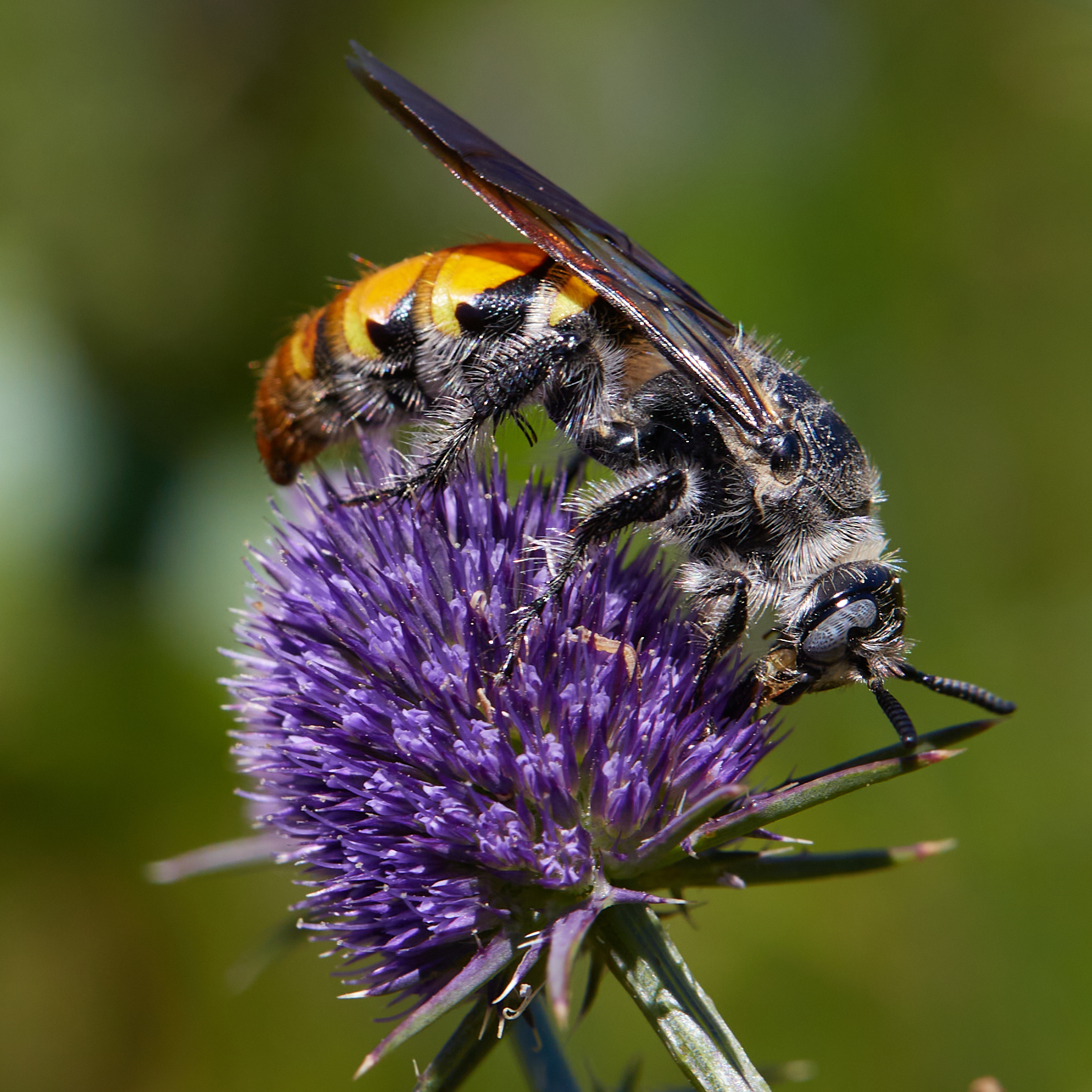
- With a Toltec scoliid wasp

Scientific classification
- Kingdom: Plantae
- Clade: Tracheophytes
- Clade: Angiosperms
- Clade: Eudicots
- Clade: Asterids
- Order: Apiales
- Family: Apiaceae
- Genus: Eryngium
- Species: E. articulatum

Binomial name
- Eryngium articulatum Hook.

= Eryngium articulatum =

Species of flowering plant in the celery family

Eryngium articulatum is a species of flowering plant in the carrot family known by the common names beethistle and jointed coyote thistle. This plant is native to the northwestern United States from California to Idaho, where it is a plant of marshes and riverbanks. This is a sturdy, branching perennial herb with rounded, naked stems reaching maximum heights over one meter. It has a few sparse, sharply serrated leaves at nodes and branching points along its stem. Atop the stem is the rounded to egg-shaped flower head, which looks superficially like that of a thistle, mainly due to its spikiness and lavender color. It is fringed with up to 17 spiny, toothed, pointed bracts, each up to about two centimeters long. Each flower head is packed full of small lavender flowers.
