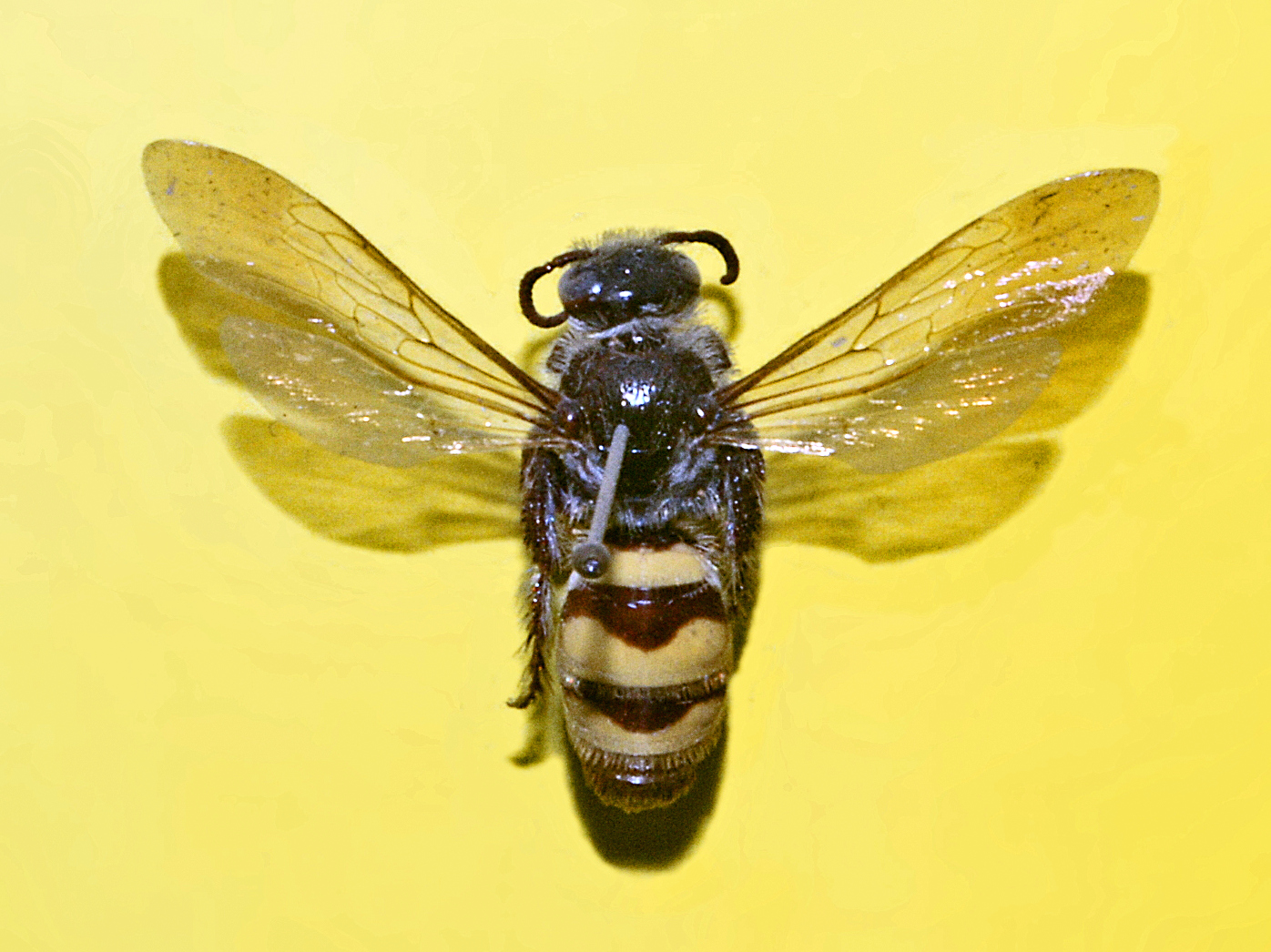
- Dielis trifasciata trifasciata. Museum specimen

Scientific classification
- Kingdom: Animalia
- Phylum: Arthropoda
- Clade: Pancrustacea
- Class: Insecta
- Order: Hymenoptera
- Family: Scoliidae
- Subfamily: Campsomerinae
- Tribe: Campsomerini
- Genus: Dielis; Saussure & Sichel, 1864

= Dielis =

Genus of wasps

Dielis is a New World genus of the family Scoliidae, also known as the scoliid wasps, formerly treated as a subgenus within Campsomeris.

== Description and identification ==
Dielis are medium sized wasps that exhibit strong sexual dimorphism. The females are black with broad yellow or orange bands on the abdomen, often on the first 3 or 4 tergites. The males have yellow bands on the first 4 or 5 tergites. The setae are usually white, though in some species there is a yellowish to brownish tint. The forewing of Dielis species includes two recurrent wing veins and two submarginal cells as typical of the genera of Campsomerini, apart from Colpa.

== Distribution ==
Species of this genus occur from Canada south to Chile and Argentina.

== Species ==
There are 12 species of Dielis:

- Dielis auripilis (Fox, 1896)
- Dielis bahamensis (Bradley, 1964)
- Dielis chilensis (Saussure, 1858)
- Dielis diabo Golfetti & Noll, 2023
- Dielis dorsata (Bradley, 1940) – Caribbean scoliid wasp
- Dielis pilipes (Saussure, 1858) – hairy-footed scoliid wasp
- Dielis plumipes (Drury, 1770) – feather-legged scoliid wasp
- Dielis pseudonyma (Schulz, 1906)
- Dielis tejensis Szafranski, 2023
- Dielis tolteca (Saussure, 1857) – Toltec scoliid wasp
- Dielis trifasciata (Fabricius, 1793) – three-banded scoliid wasp
- Dielis whitelyi (Kirby, 1889)

== Gallery ==
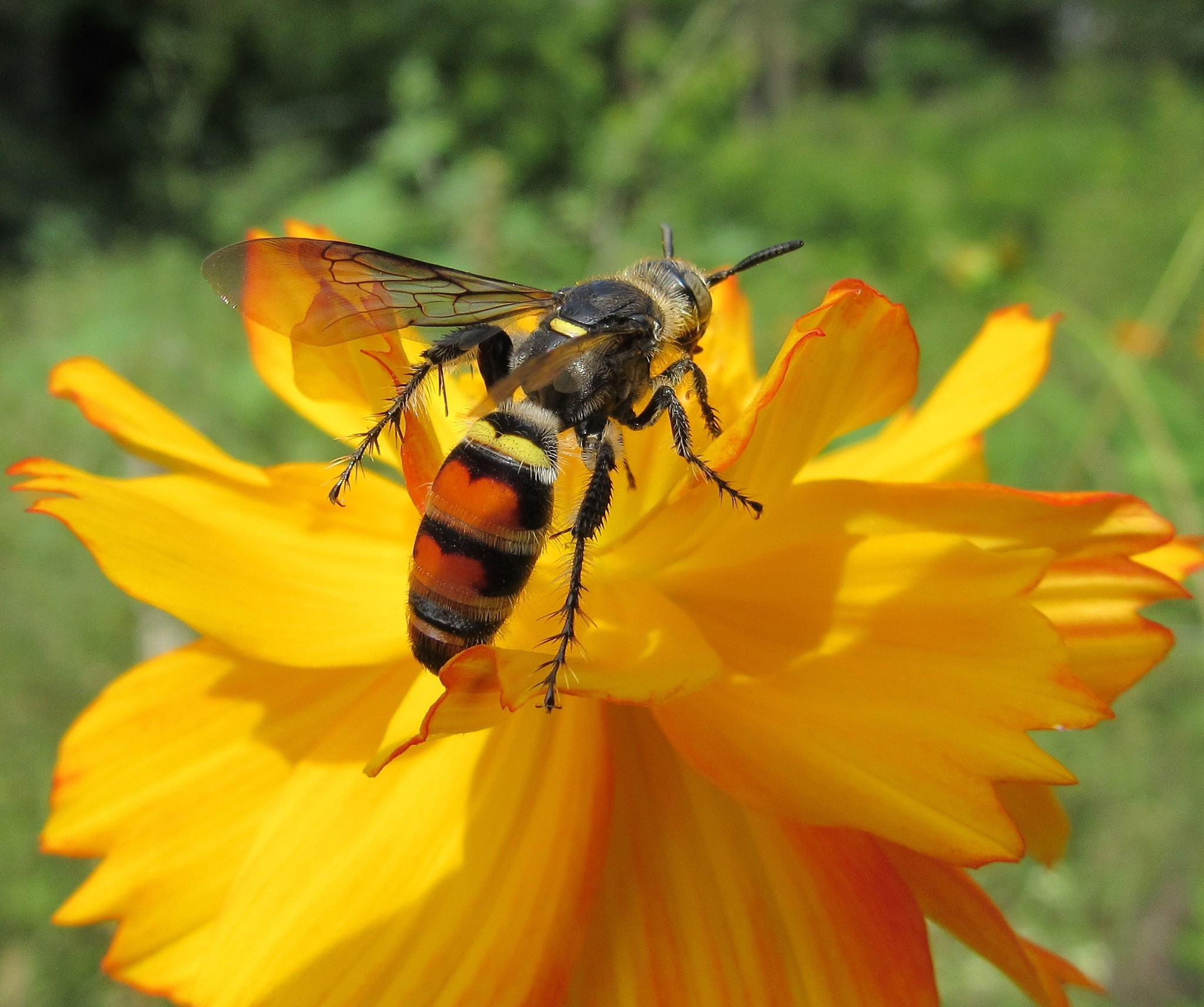
D. diabo female in Brazil.

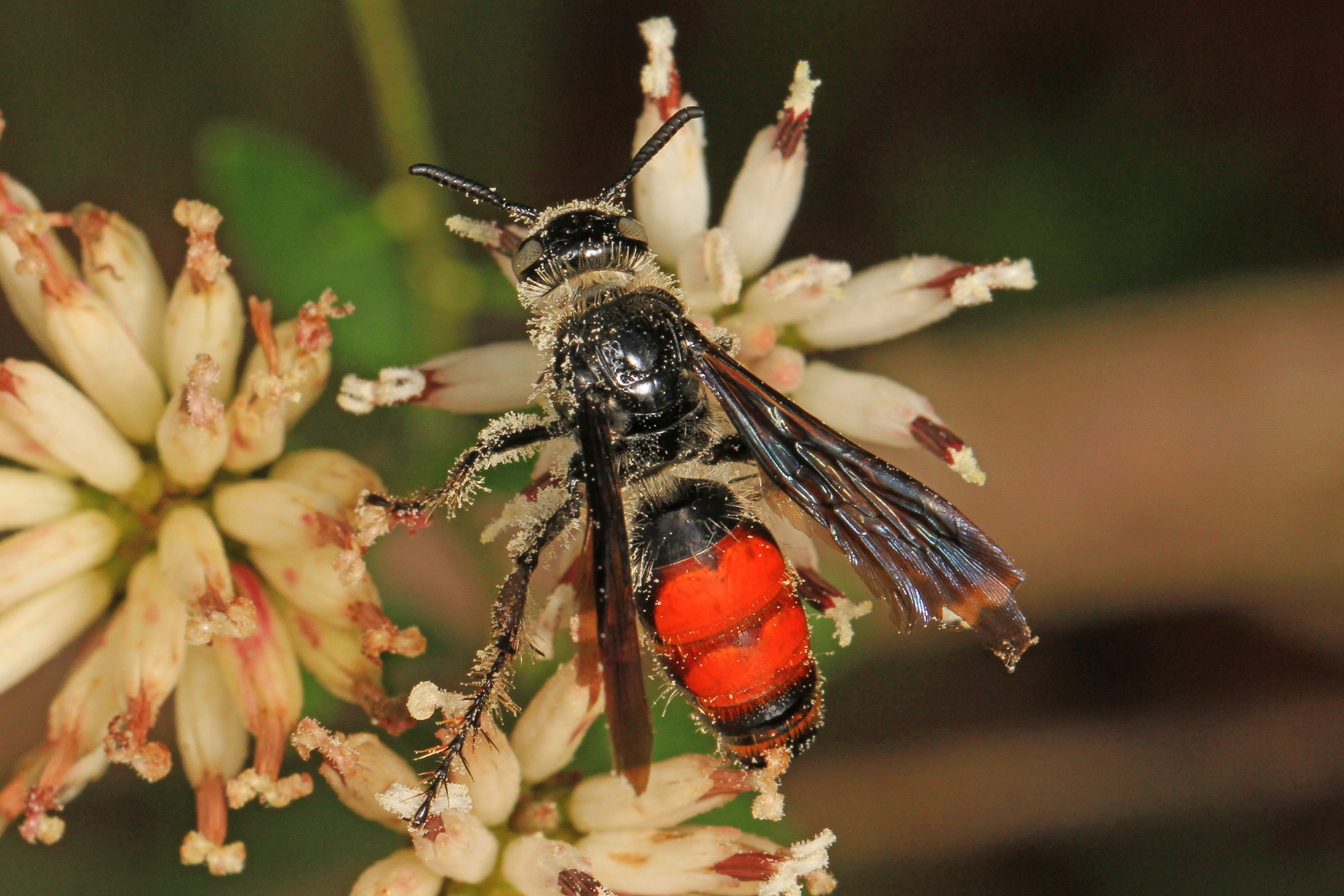
D. dorsata female in Florida.

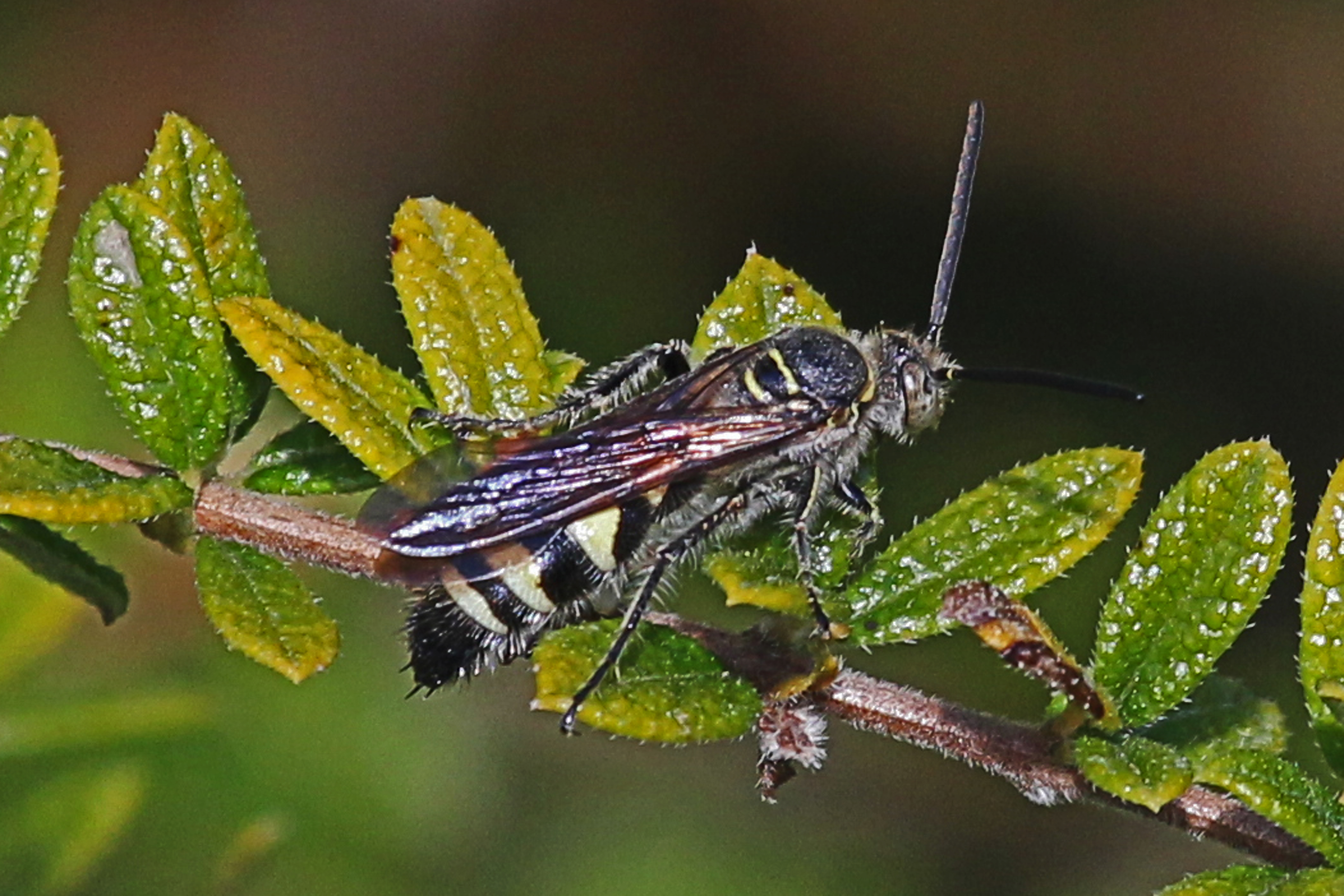
D. dorsata male in Florida.

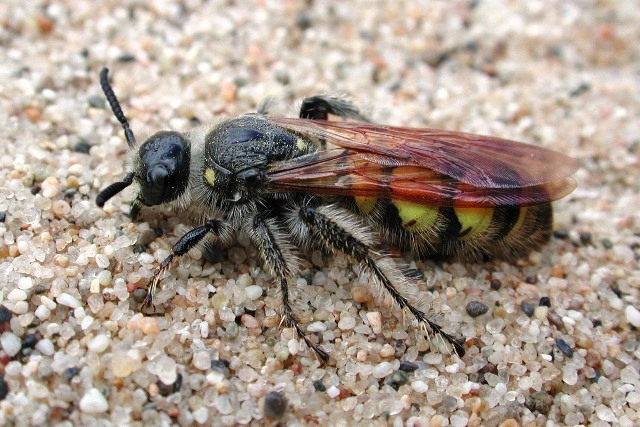
D. pilipes female in the western United States.

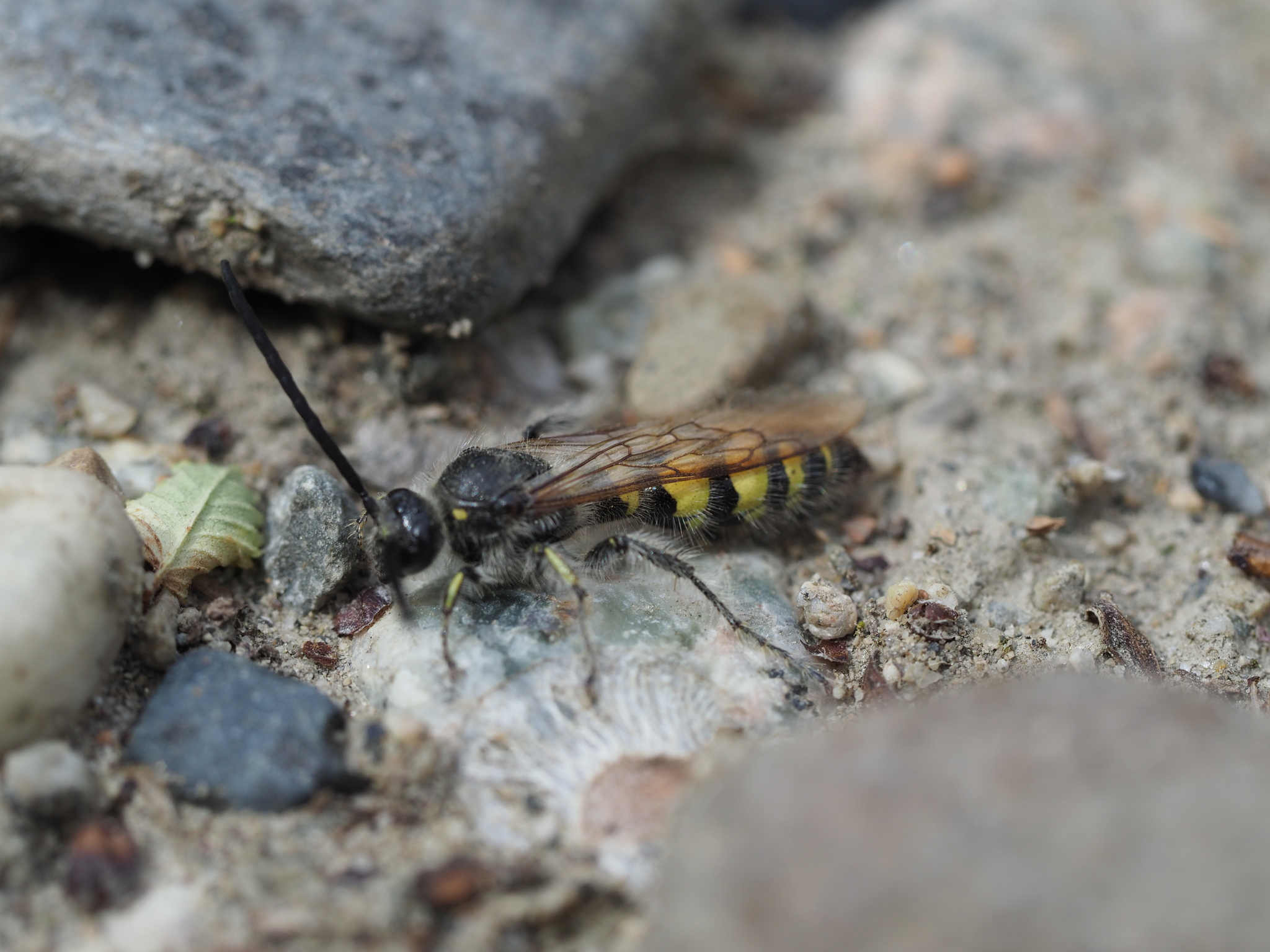
D. pilipes male in California.

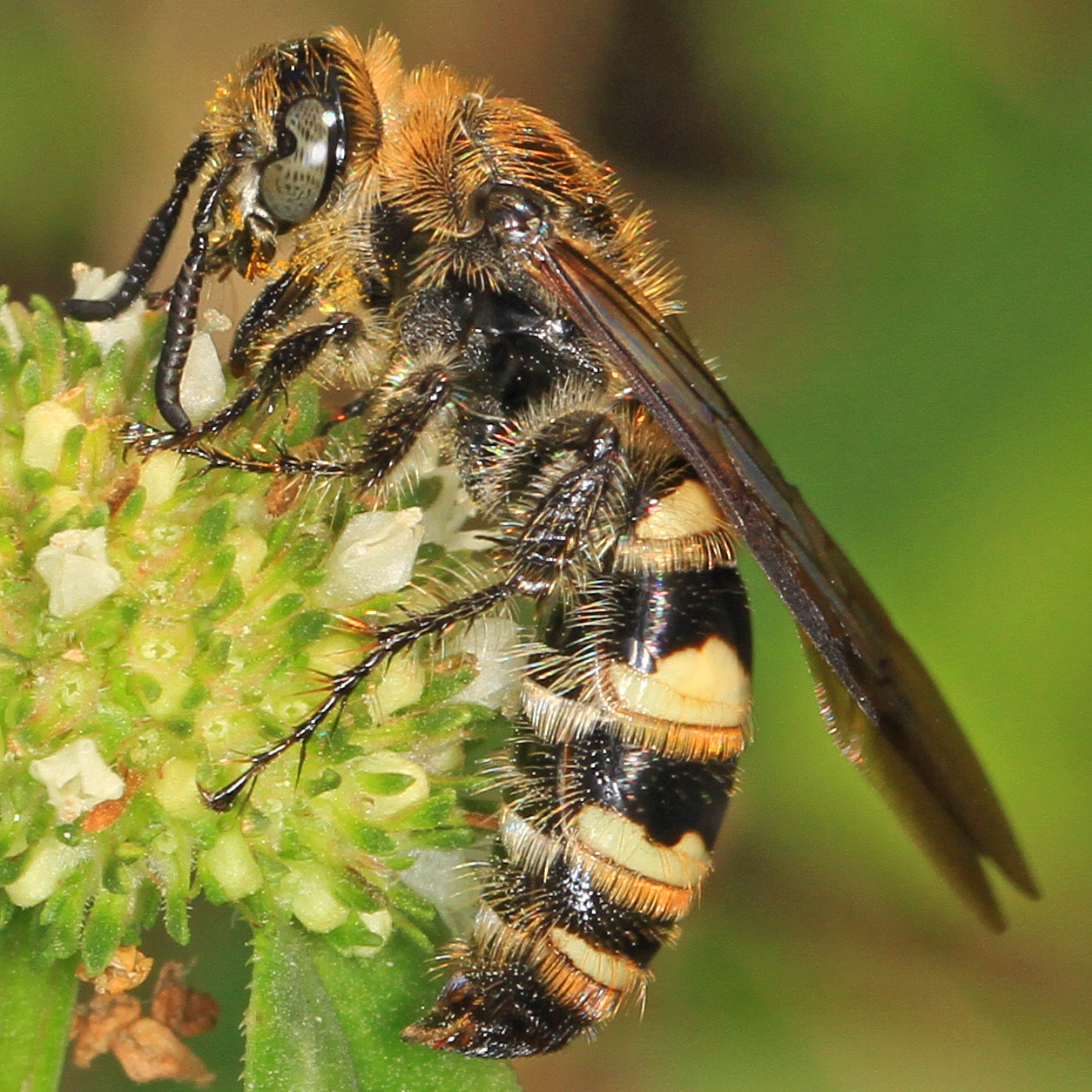
D. plumipes fossulana female in Florida.

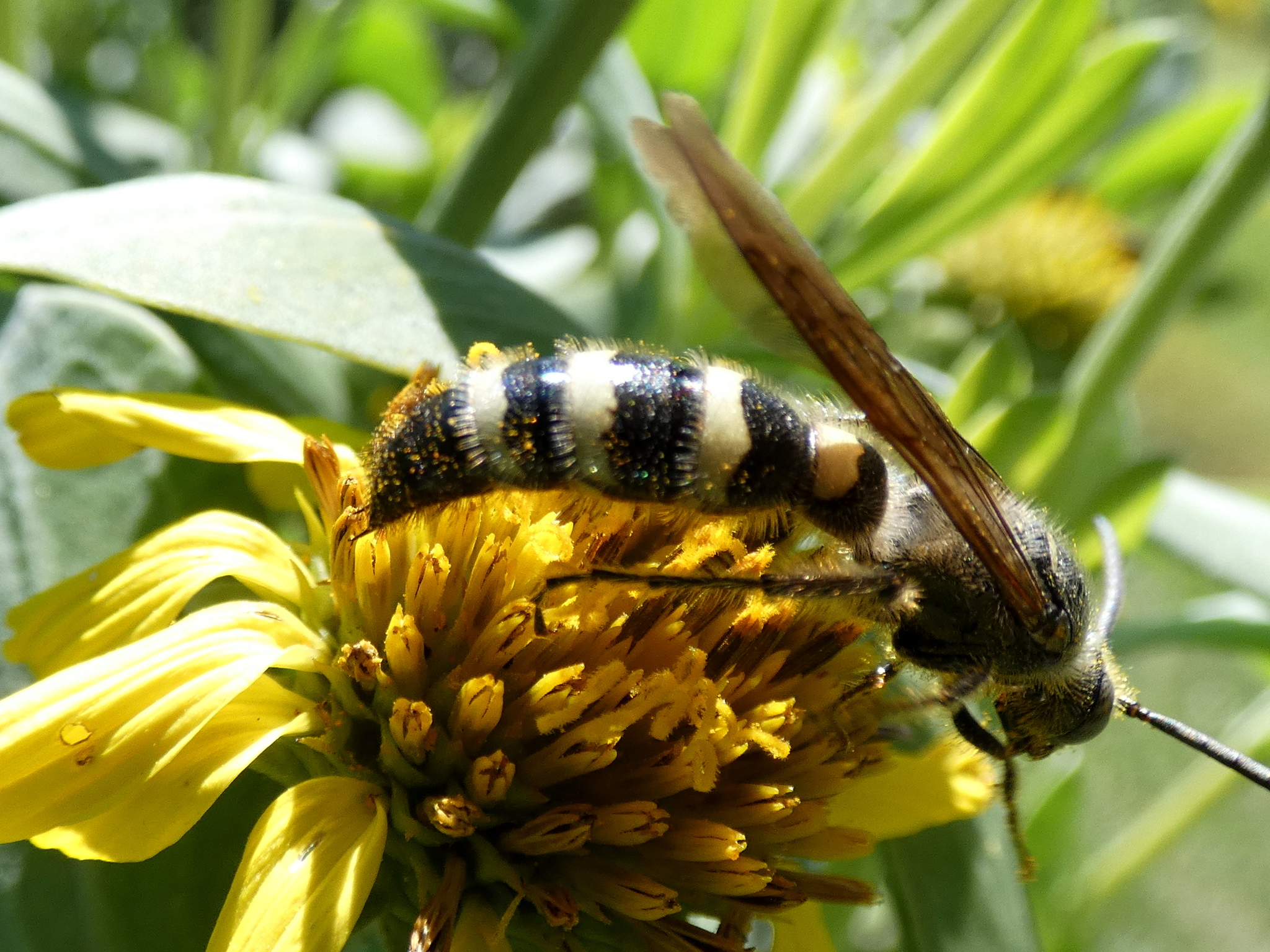
D. plumipes fossulana male in Florida.

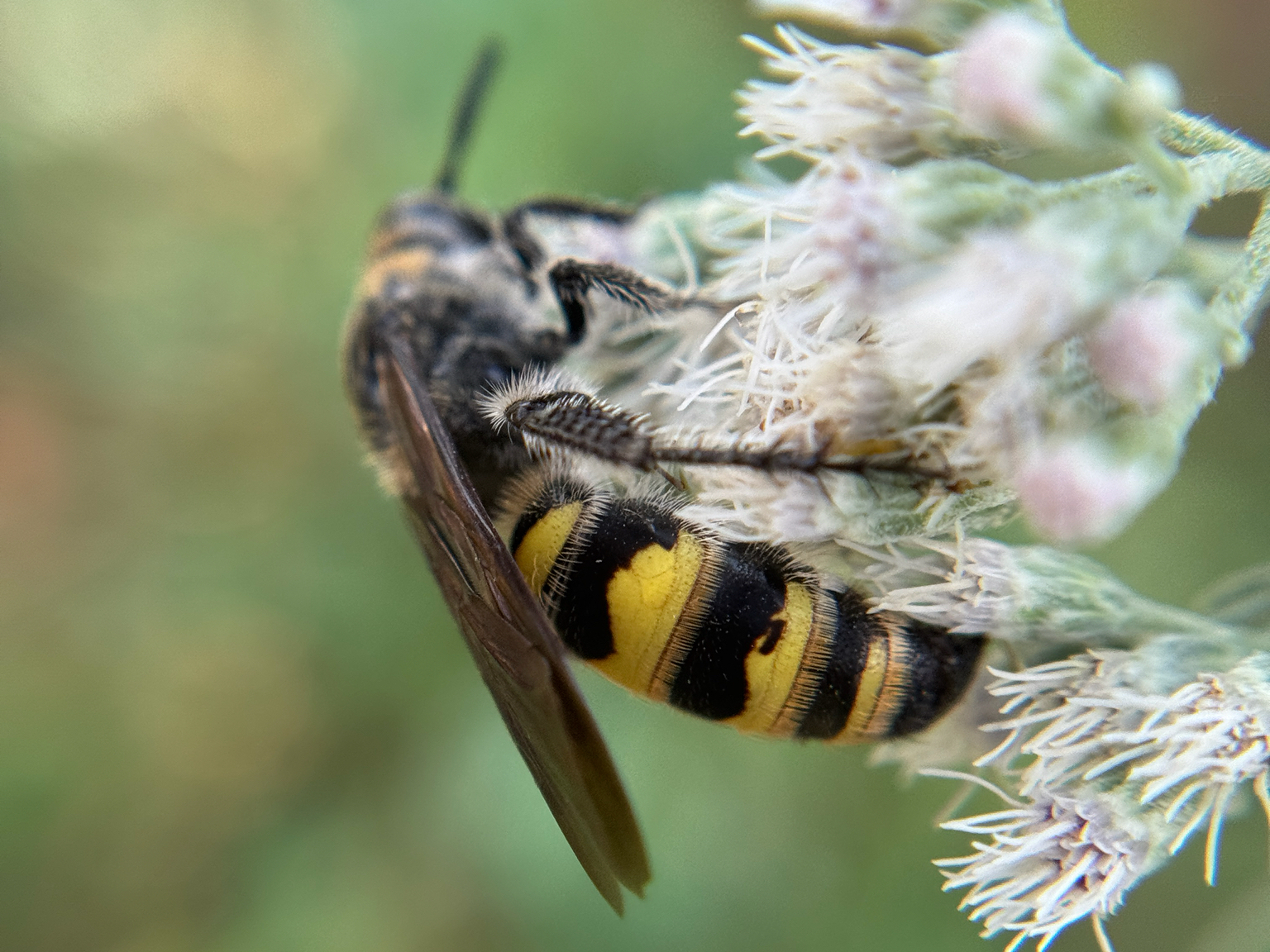
D. tejensis female in Texas.

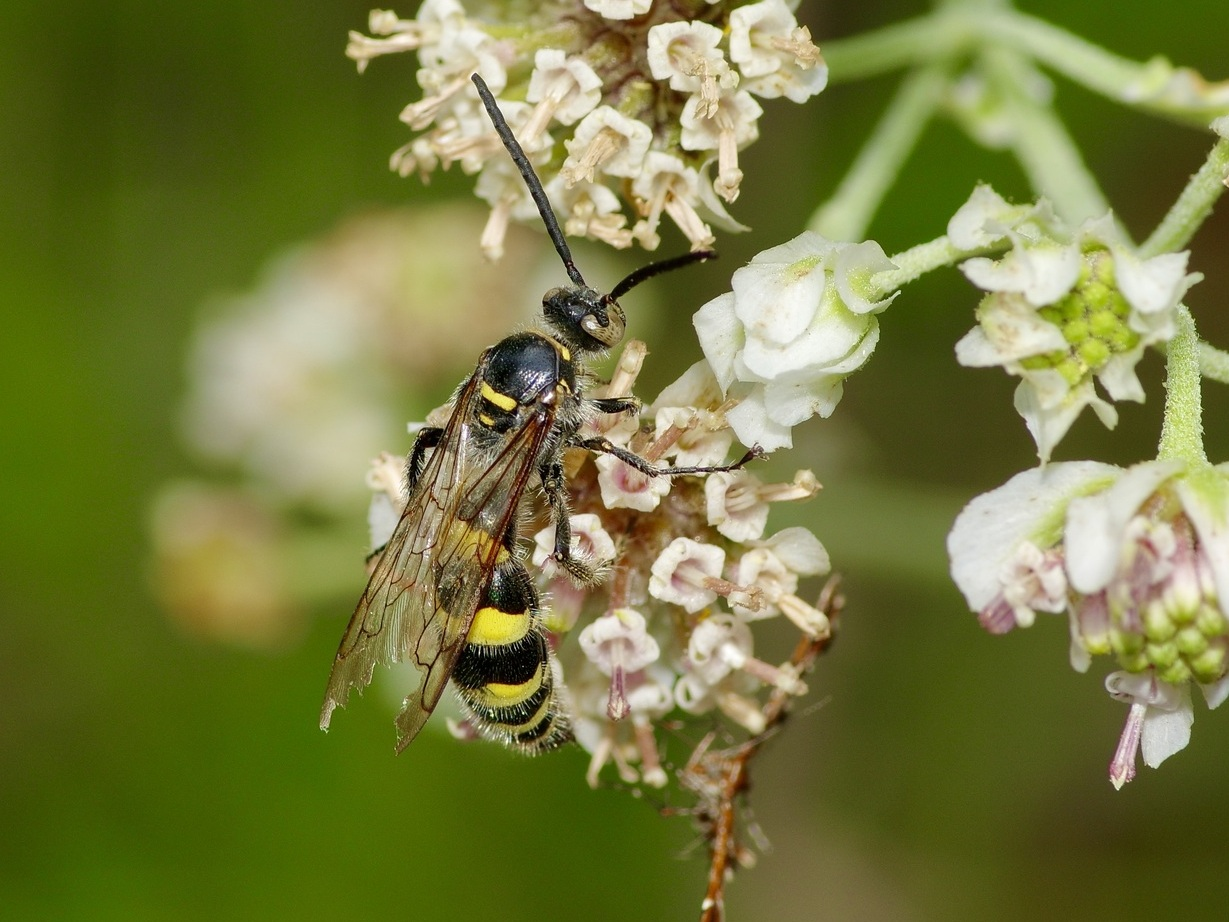
D. tejensis male in Texas.

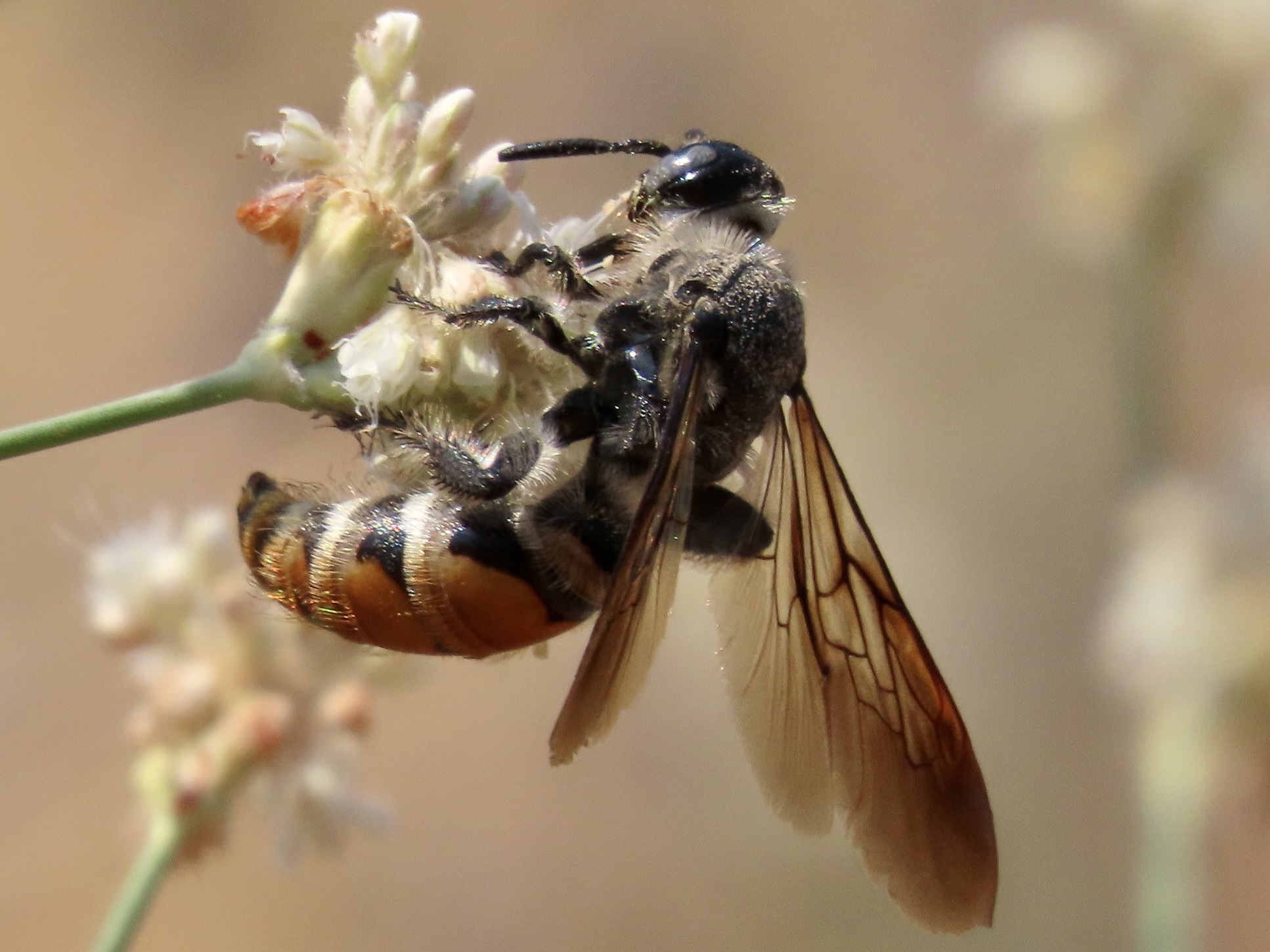
D. tolteca female in California.

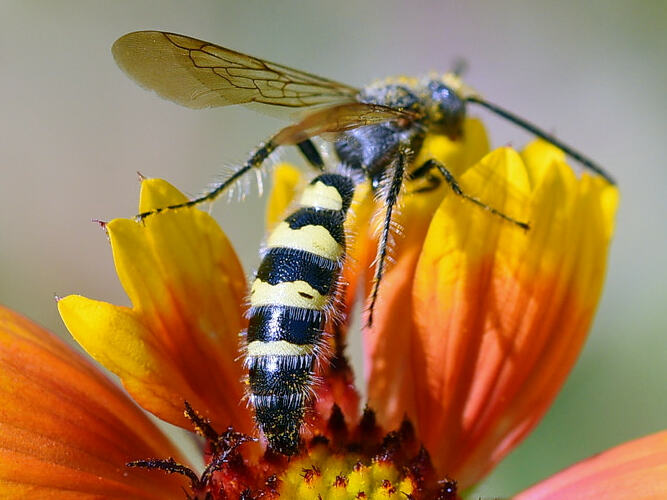
D. tolteca male in California.

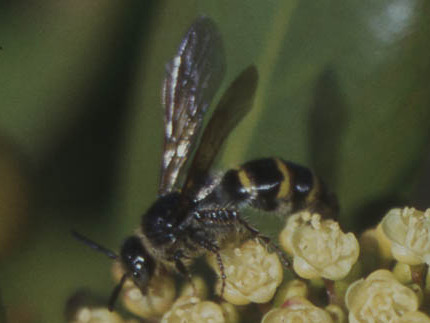
D. trifasciata nassauensis female in the Bahamas.

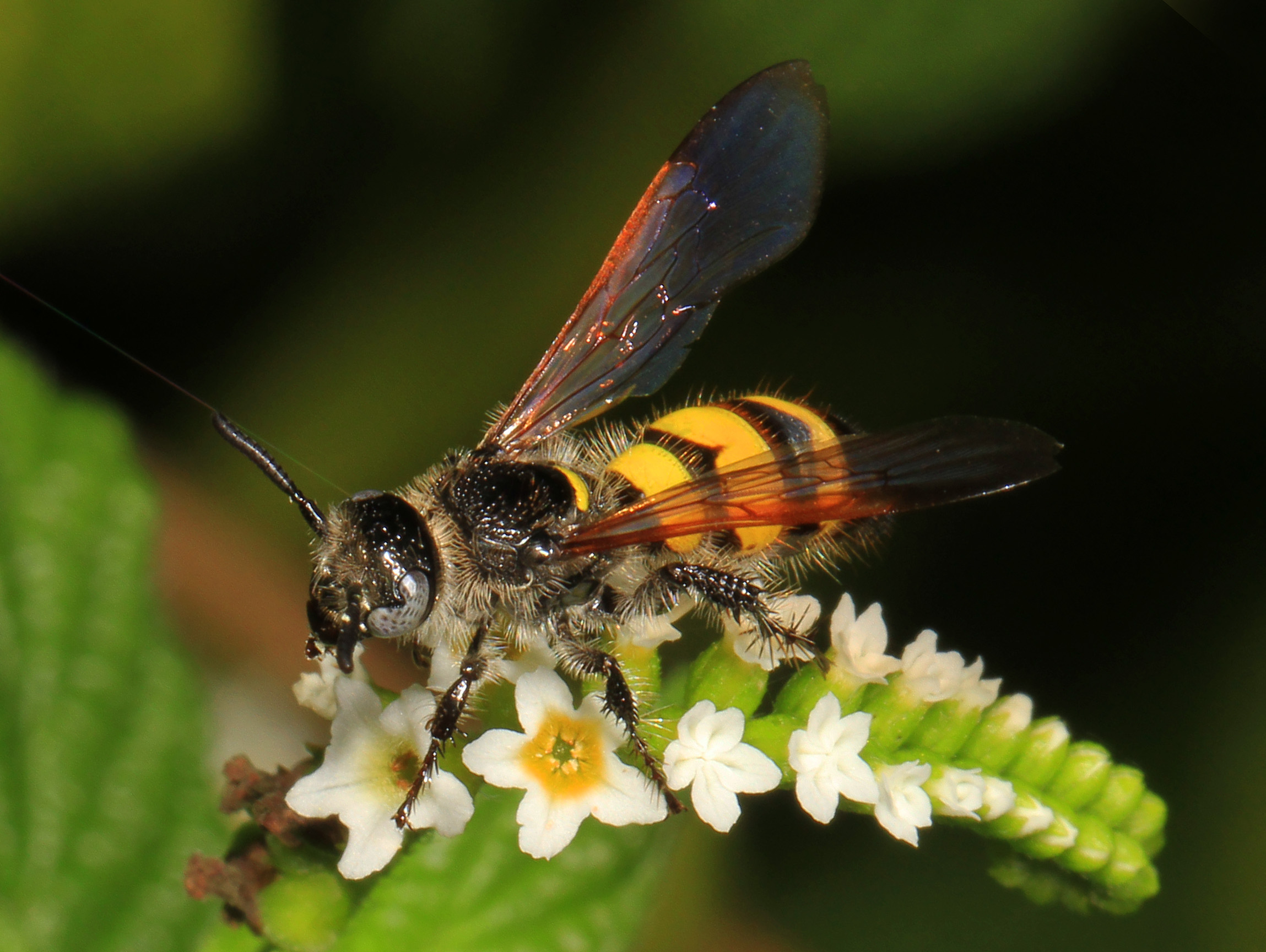
D. trifasciata trifasciata female in Florida.

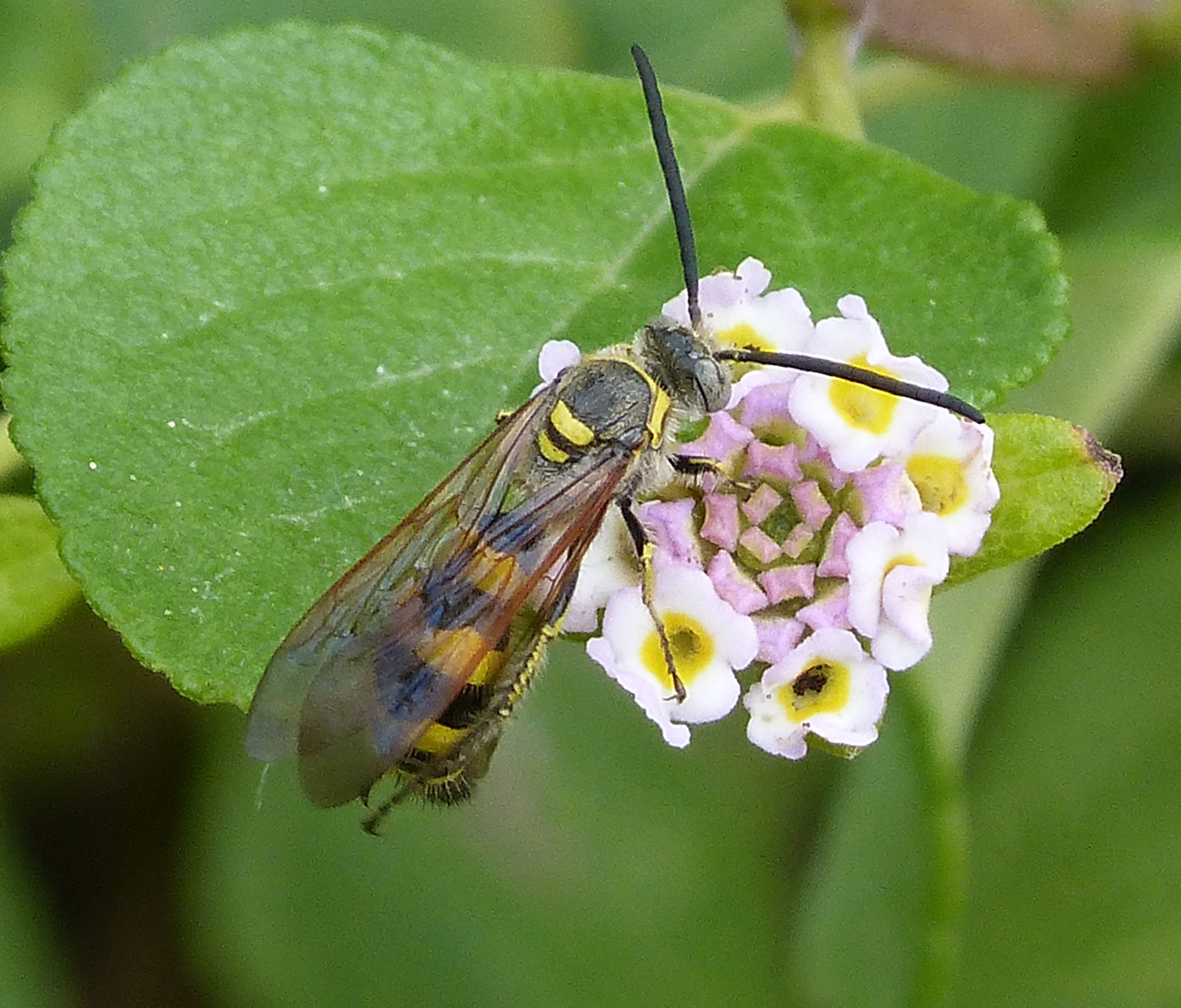
D. trifasciata trifasciata male in Cuba.
