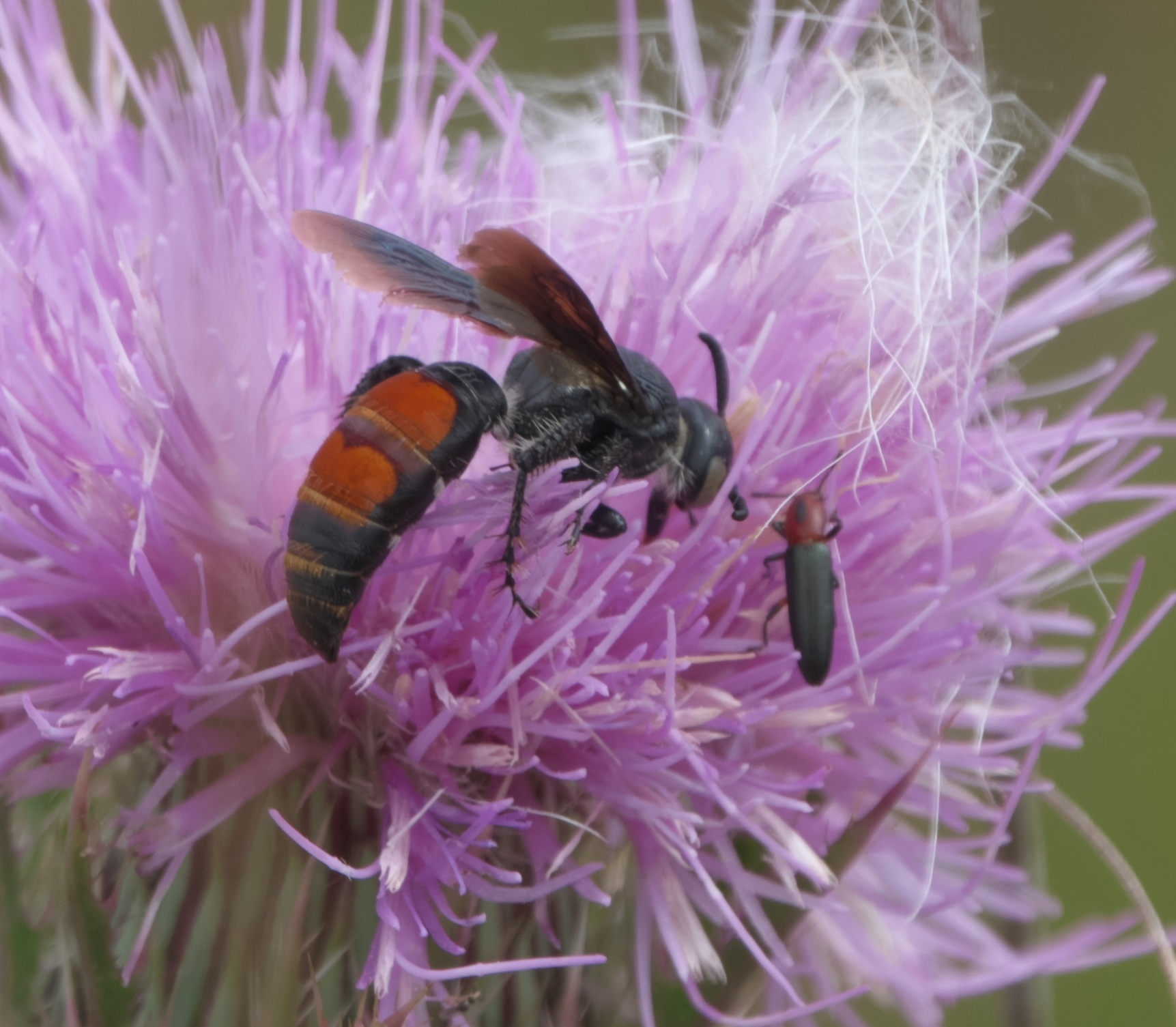
- Female Dielis dorsata in Florida
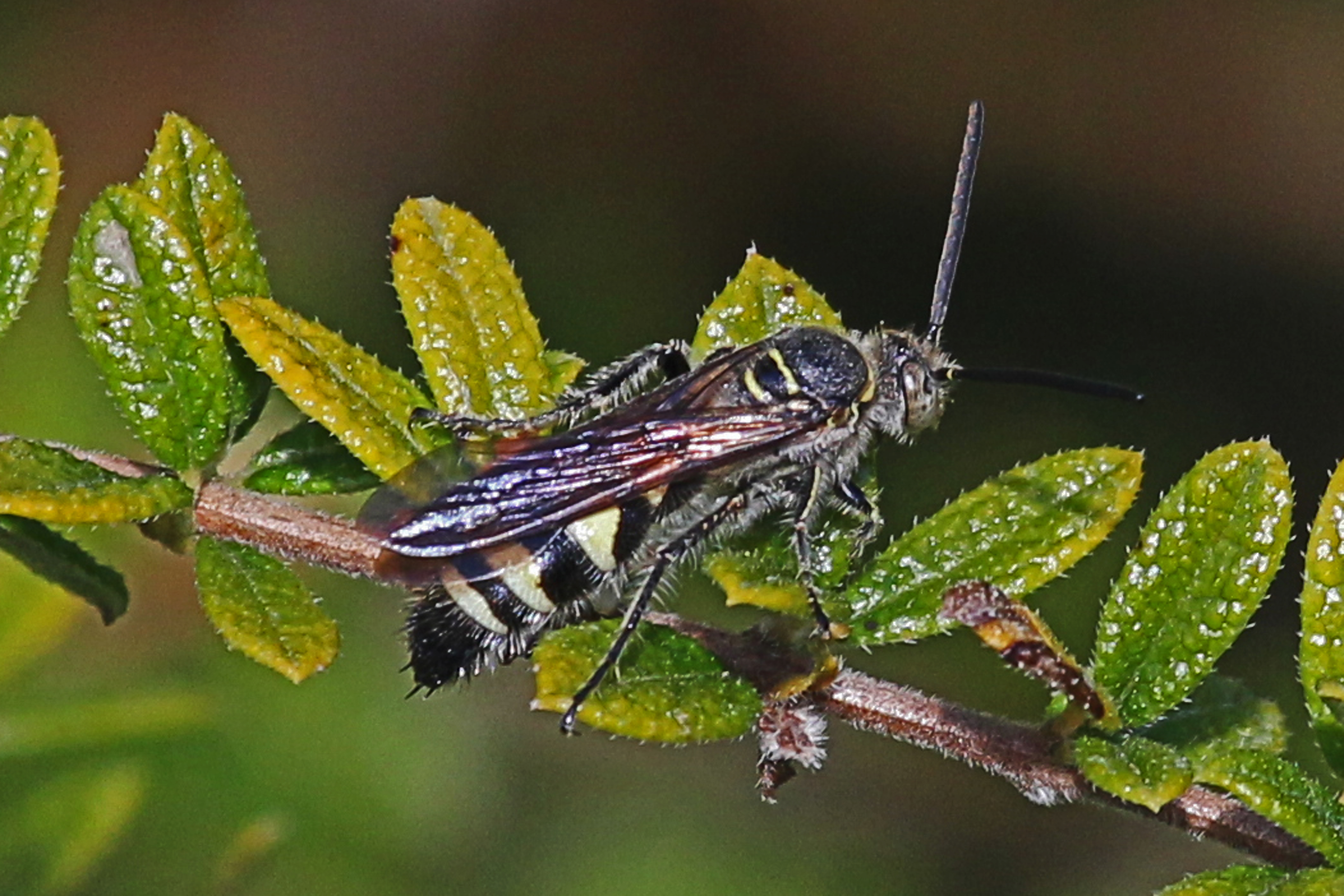
- Male D. dorsata in Florida

Scientific classification
- Kingdom: Animalia
- Phylum: Arthropoda
- Clade: Pancrustacea
- Class: Insecta
- Order: Hymenoptera
- Family: Scoliidae
- Tribe: Campsomerini
- Genus: Dielis
- Species: D. dorsata

Binomial name
- Dielis dorsata (Fabricius 1787)

= Dielis dorsata =

Species of scoliid wasp

Dielis dorsata, the Caribbean scoliid wasp, is a species of scoliid wasp in the family Scoliidae.
