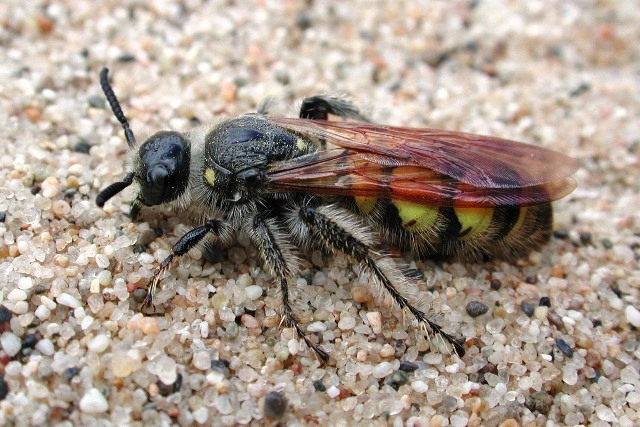
- Dielis pilipes photographed in the western United States

Scientific classification
- Domain: Eukaryota
- Kingdom: Animalia
- Phylum: Arthropoda
- Class: Insecta
- Order: Hymenoptera
- Family: Scoliidae
- Tribe: Campsomerini
- Genus: Dielis
- Species: D. pilipes

Binomial name
- Dielis pilipes (Saussure 1858)

= Dielis pilipes =

Species of scoliid wasp

Dielis pilipes, the hairy-footed scoliid wasp, is a species of scoliid wasp in the family Scoliidae.
