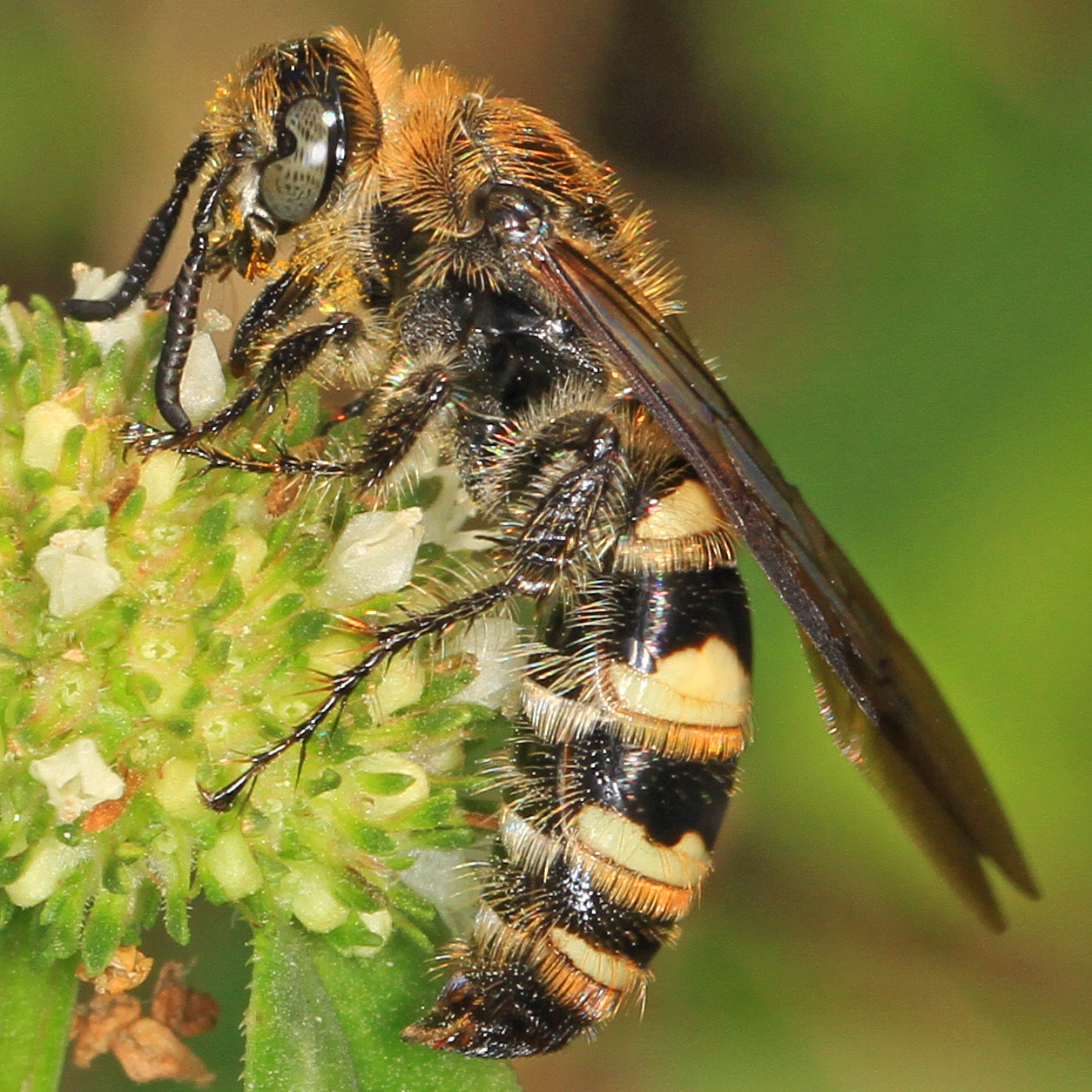
- Dielis plumipes fossulana in Florida

Scientific classification
- Kingdom: Animalia
- Phylum: Arthropoda
- Clade: Pancrustacea
- Class: Insecta
- Order: Hymenoptera
- Family: Scoliidae
- Tribe: Campsomerini
- Genus: Dielis
- Species: D. plumipes

Binomial name
- Dielis plumipes (Drury, 1770)

= Dielis plumipes =

Species of scoliid wasp

Dielis plumipes, the feather-legged scoliid wasp, is a species of scoliid wasp in the family Scoliidae.

== Description and identification ==
Females of D. plumipes have a black scutellum and yellow bands on the first three or four tergites. The setae along the pronotal collar are usually orangish. Males, as in most species of the genus, have yellow bands on the first four tergites and primarily whitish setae on the body. They have the pronotum entirely black, or nearly so, and are distinguished chromatically from allied species by the entirely black clypeus and by the entirely black mid and hind legs.

== Distribution ==
D. plumipes occurs in the eastern and central United States. The largest populations are the central subspecies, D. p. confluenta, and the southeastern subspecies, D. p. fossulana. A third subspecies, the nominate D. p. plumipes, occurs in a small pocket along the eastern coast within the Carolinian life zone.

== Subspecies ==
There are three subspecies of D. plumipes:

- Dielis plumipes confluenta (Say, 1823)
- Dielis plumipes fossulana (Fabricius, 1804)
- Dielis plumipes plumipes (Drury, 1770)

== Gallery ==
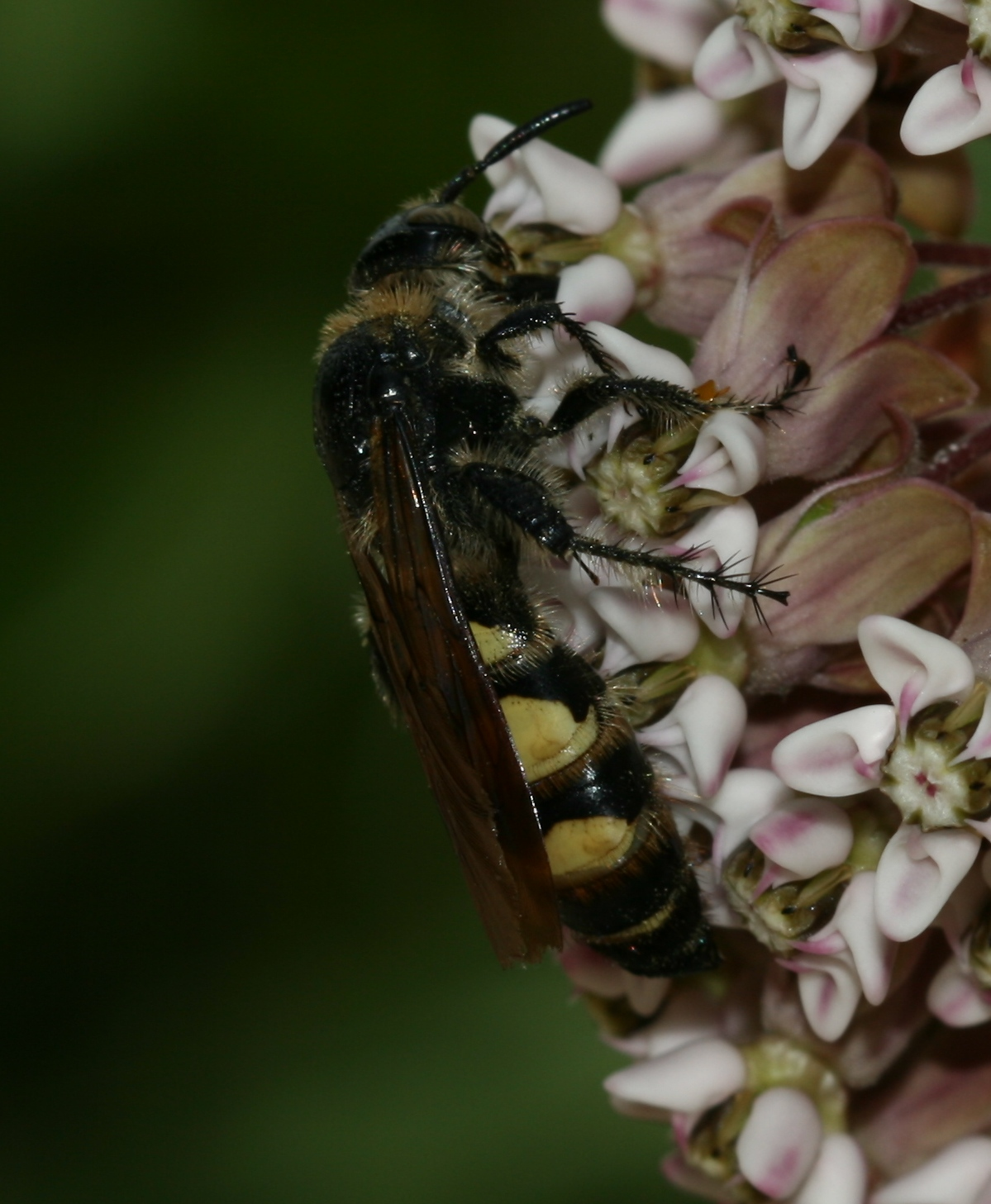
D. plumipes confluenta female in Ontario

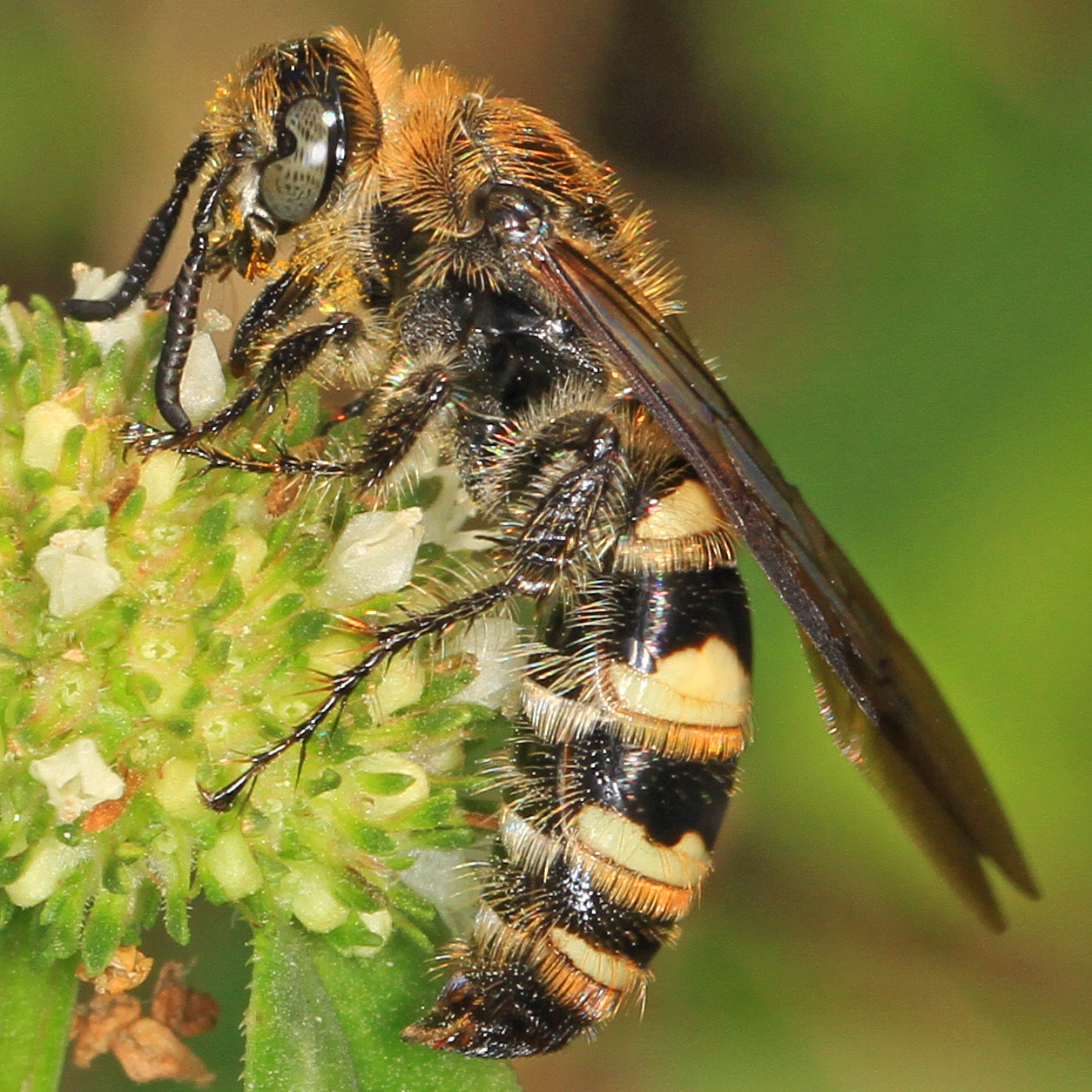
D. plumipes fossulana female in Florida

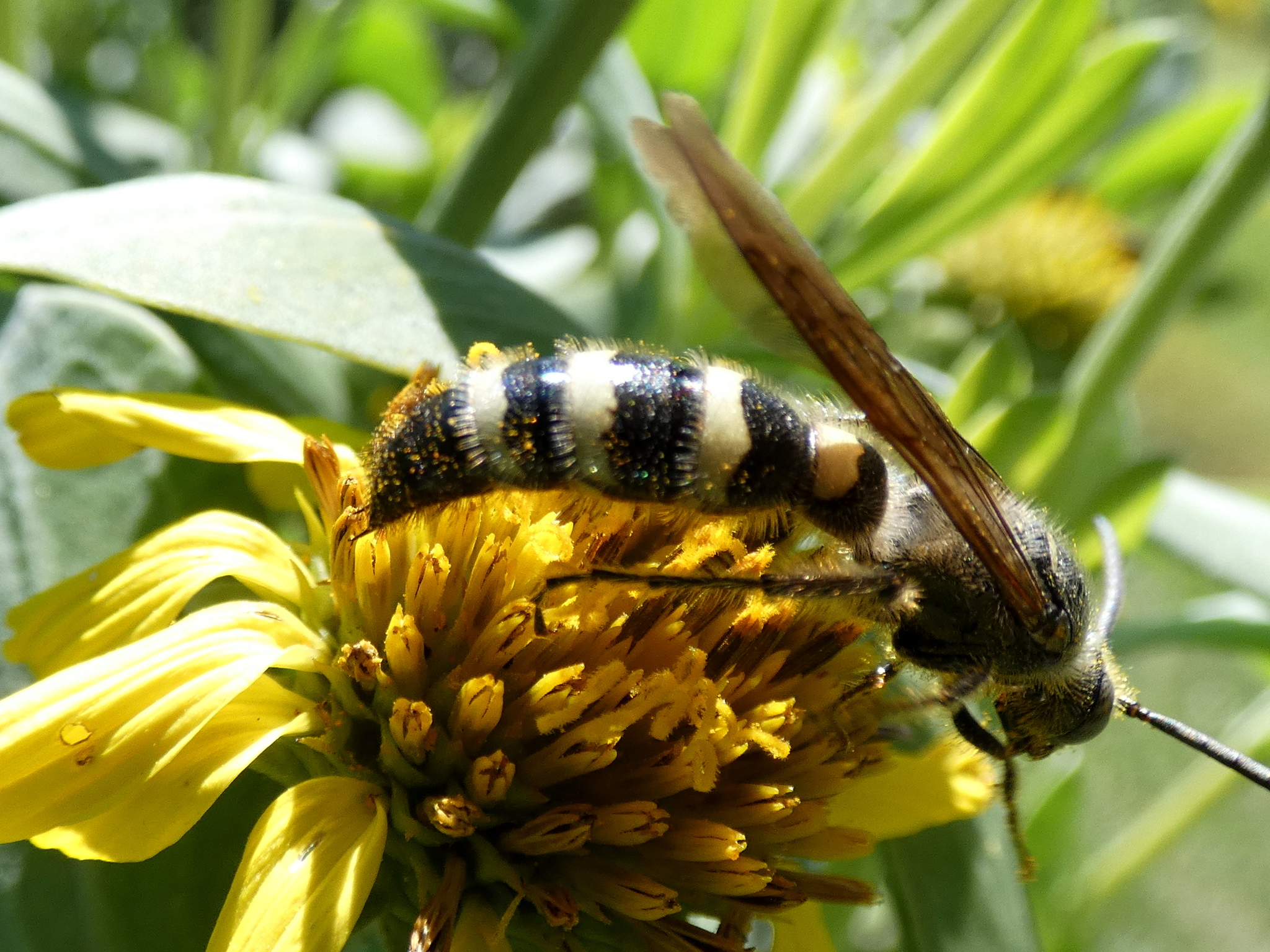
D. plumipes fossulana male in Florida

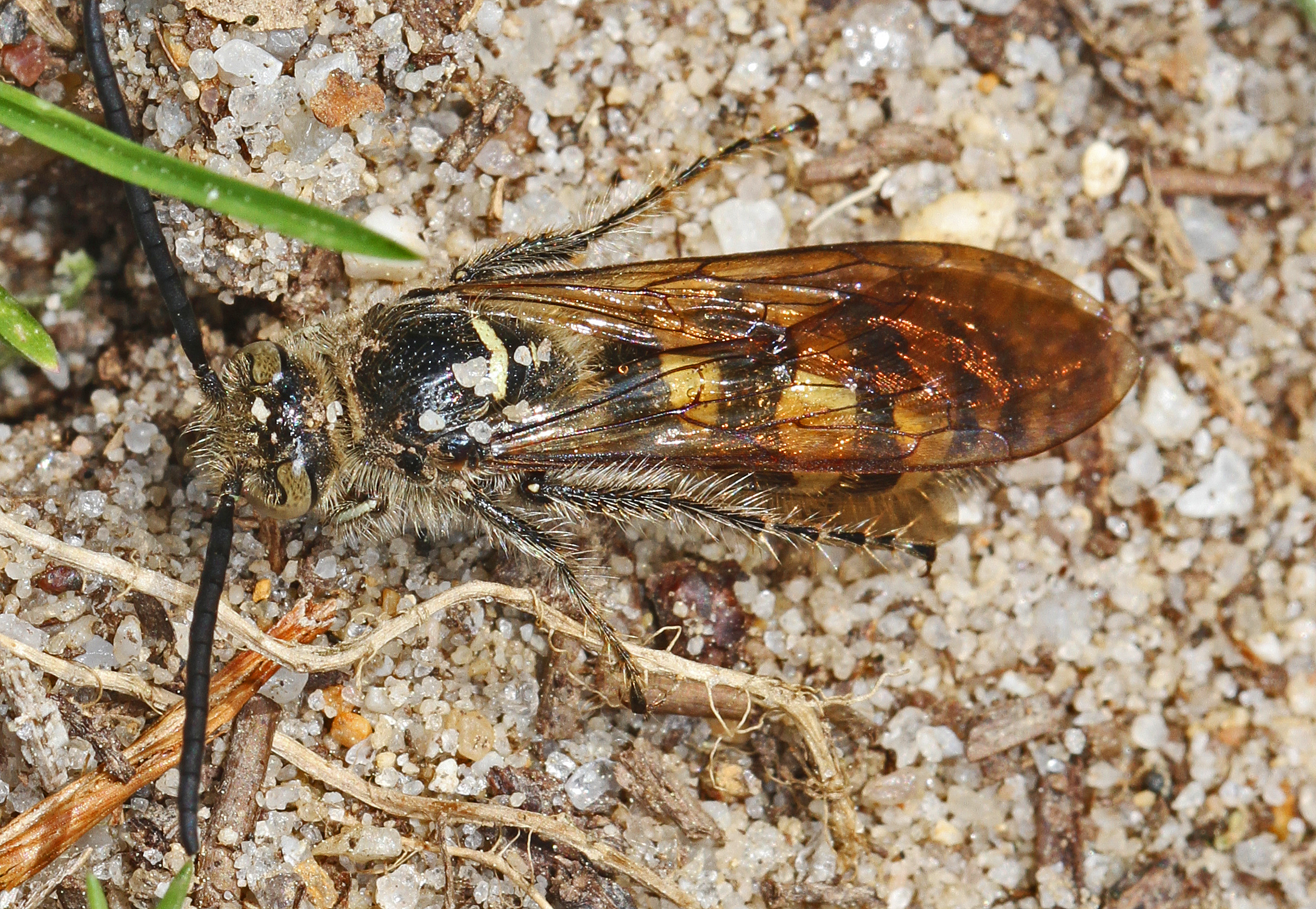
D. plumipes plumipes female in Maryland.
