= Scolia =

Scolia may refer to:

- Scolia (wasp), a genus in the family Scoliidae
- Skolion (pl. skolia or scolia), a song sung by invited guests at banquets in ancient Greece

== See also ==
- Scholia, marginal commentaries in the manuscripts of ancient authors
- Wikidata:Scholia, a project presenting bibliographic information and scholarly profiles of authors and institutions via Wikidata
