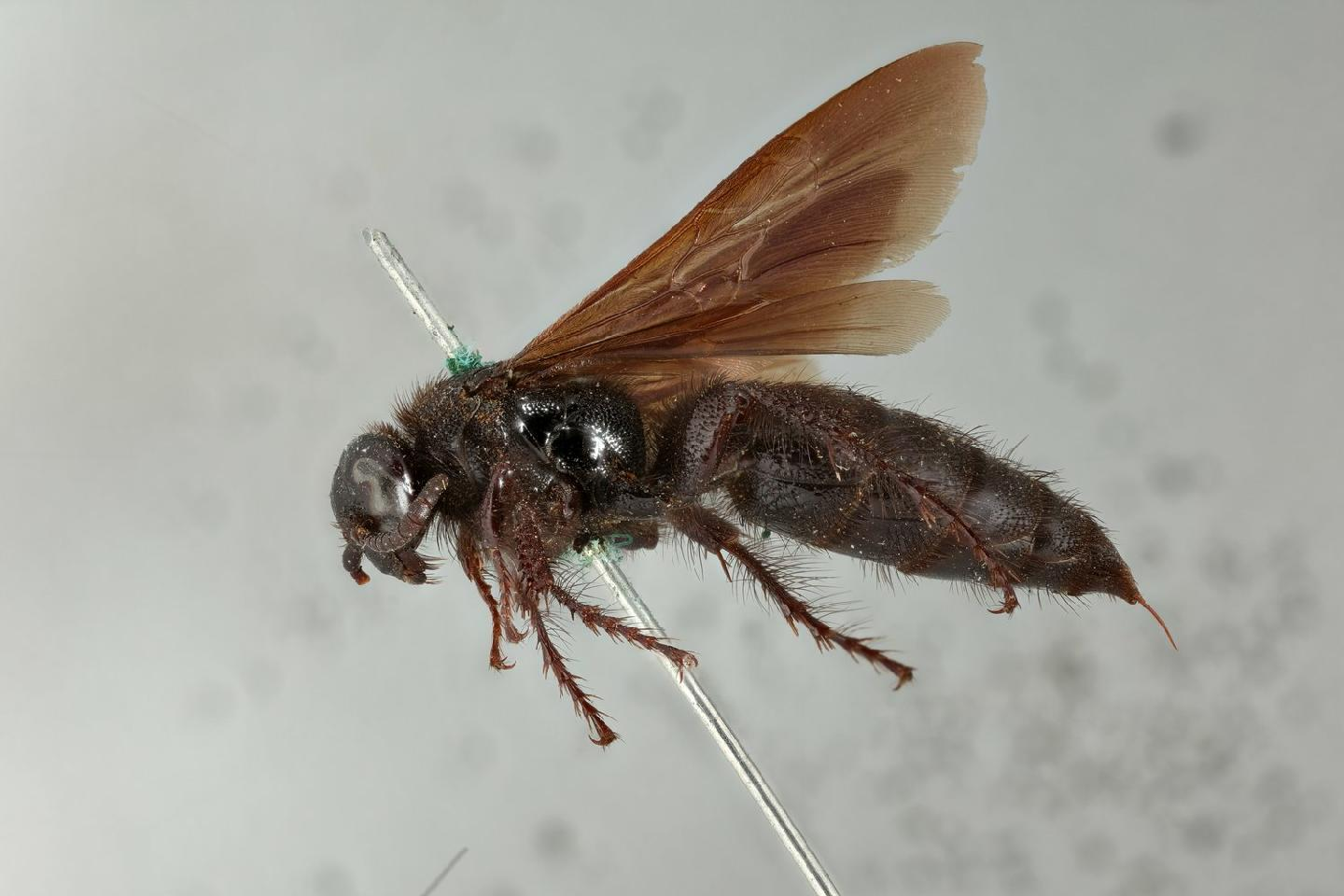

Scientific classification
- Domain: Eukaryota
- Kingdom: Animalia
- Phylum: Arthropoda
- Class: Insecta
- Order: Hymenoptera
- Family: Scoliidae
- Genus: Scolia
- Species: S. carbonaria

Binomial name
- Scolia carbonaria (Linneus, 1767)

= Scolia carbonaria =

Species of wasp

Scolia carbonaria is a species of wasp in the family Scoliidae.

The species was first described by Carl Linnaeus in 1767 using the name Apis carbonaria. The genus Apis is now part of the bee family Apidae and the species Linnaeus described as Apis carbonaria was based upon a Scoliid wasp, so the original name has become a Basionym. Species later synonymised with Scolia carbonaria include Scolia maura by Johan Fabricius (1793), and Scolia neglecta by Domenico Cirillo (1787).

A specimen of this species which belonged to Carl Linnaeus is held in the collections of the Linnean Society, London.

== Characteristics ==
Scolia carbonaria has wings that are brown in colour rather than transparent. It is considered a melanistic species. In 2019 Jean-Baptiste Castagnet and Jacques Bitsch produced a key to show how Scolia carbonaria can be distinguished in its characteristics from the similar-looking species Scolia (Discolia) propodealis and the melanistic form of Scolia hortorum, for example S. carbonaria averages at a slightly larger size than the other two species (females at 17–19 mm in length, and males at 16–18 mm).

== Distribution ==
Based upon live observations and preserved museum specimens Scolia carbonaria has a wide distribution across the Mediterranean, Middle East and Asia, having been observed in Algeria, Egypt, India, Israel, Palestine, Spain, Tunisia, Turkmenistan, the United Arab Emirates, and Italy.
