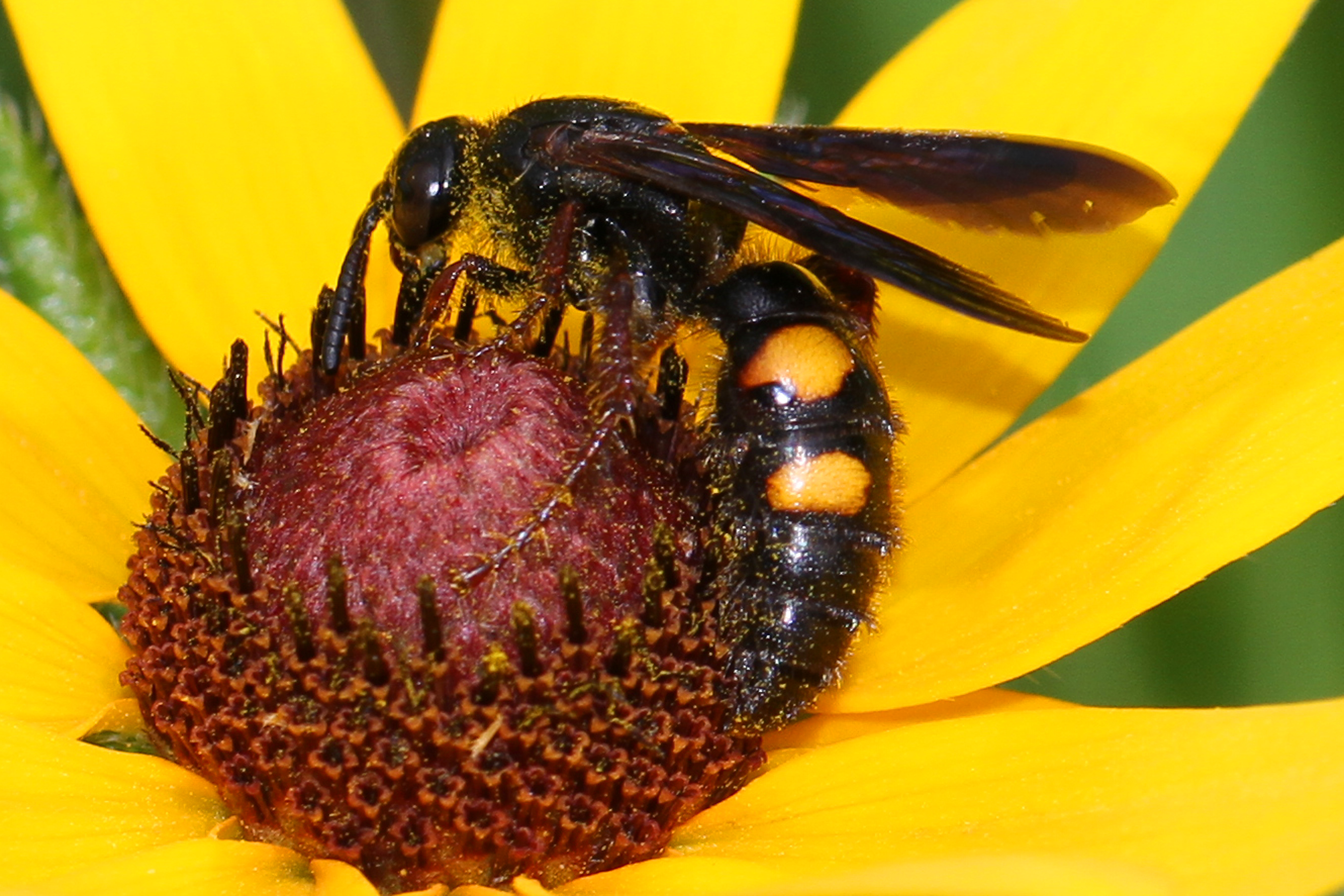

Scientific classification
- Domain: Eukaryota
- Kingdom: Animalia
- Phylum: Arthropoda
- Class: Insecta
- Order: Hymenoptera
- Family: Scoliidae
- Genus: Scolia
- Species: S. nobilitata

Binomial name
- Scolia nobilitata Fabricius, 1805

Synonyms
- Scolia fulviventris Bartlett, 1912; Scolia flavocostalis Cresson, 1868; Scolia lecontei Cresson, 1868; Scolia lewisii Cresson, 1868; Scolia ridingsii Cresson, 1865; Scolia inconstans Cresson, 1865; Scolia consors Saussure, 1864; Scolia otomita Saussure, 1858; Scolia amoena Cresson, 1856; Scolia ornata Smith, 1855; Scolia maculata Guerin, 1838; Scolia tricincta Say, 1823; Scolia tricolor Klug, 1805; Scolia bifasciata (Swederus, 1787)

= Scolia nobilitata =

Species of wasp

Scolia nobilitata, also known as the noble scoliid wasp, is a species of scoliid wasp in the family Scoliidae.

== Subspecies ==
Three subspecies are listed for S. nobilitata:

- Scolia nobilitata nobilitata Fabricius, 1805
- Scolia nobilitata otomita Saussure, 1858
- Scolia nobilitata tricincta Say, 1823

== Gallery ==
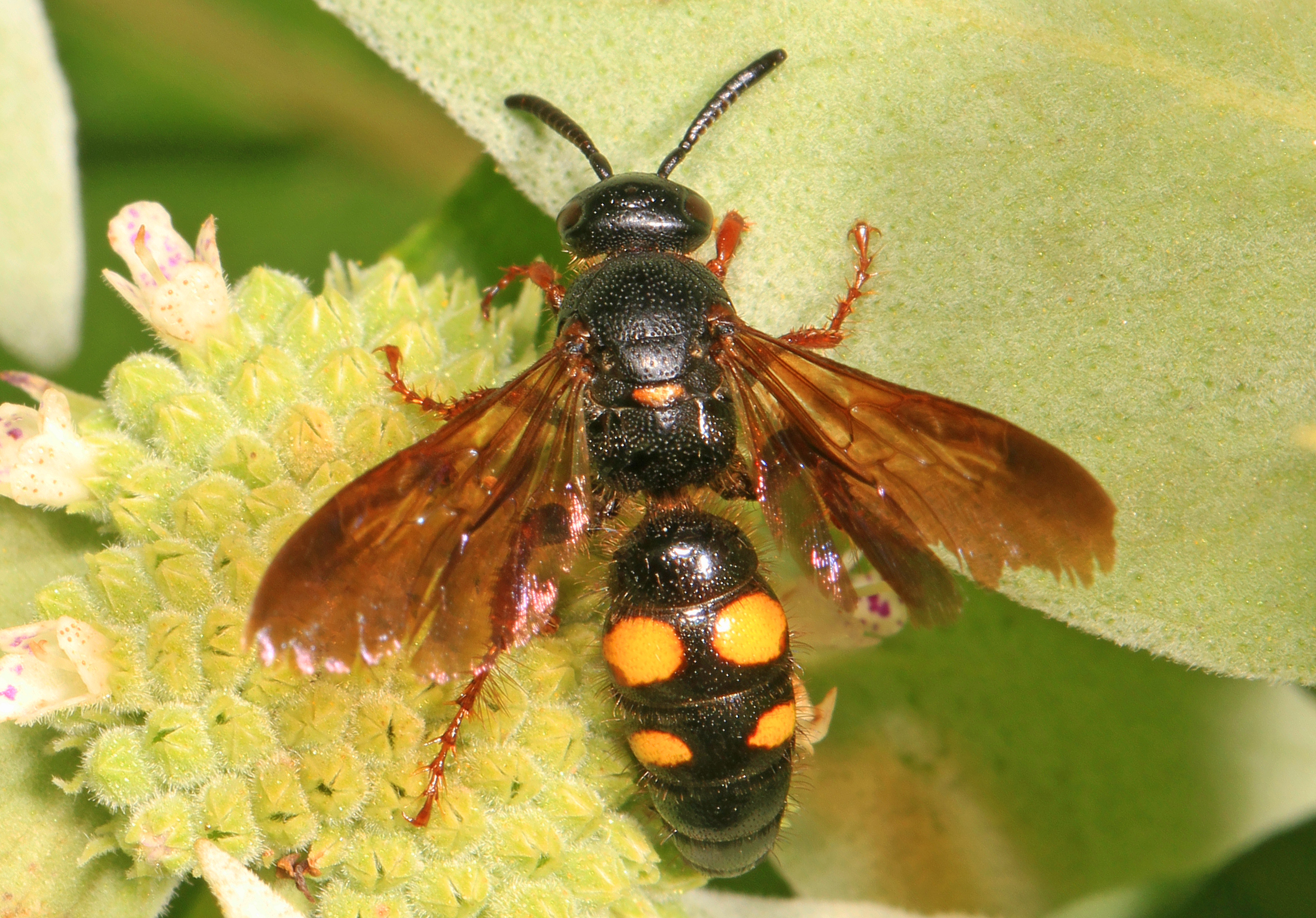
S. nobilitata nobilitata photographed in Virginia

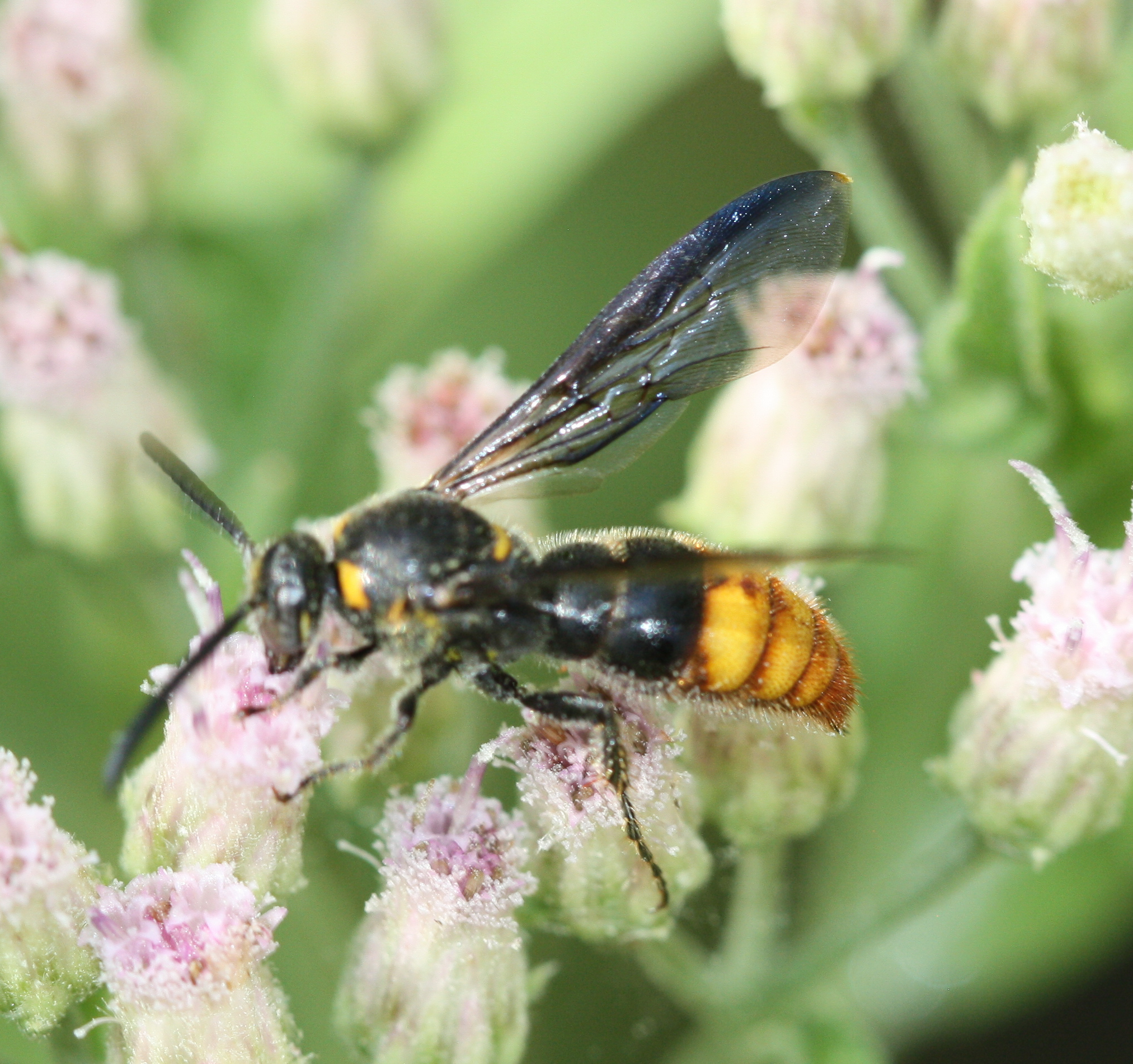
S. nobilitata otomita photographed in Arizona

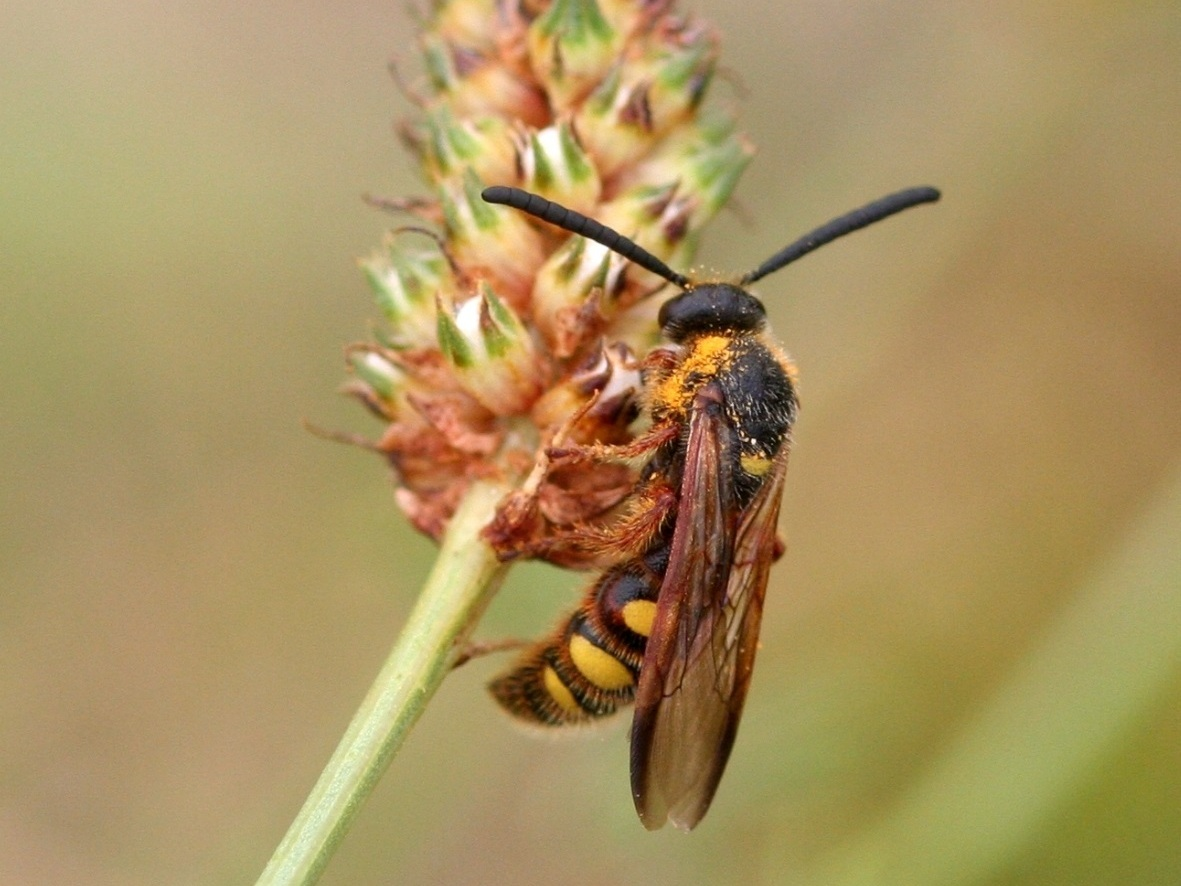
S. nobilitata tricincta photographed in Colorado
