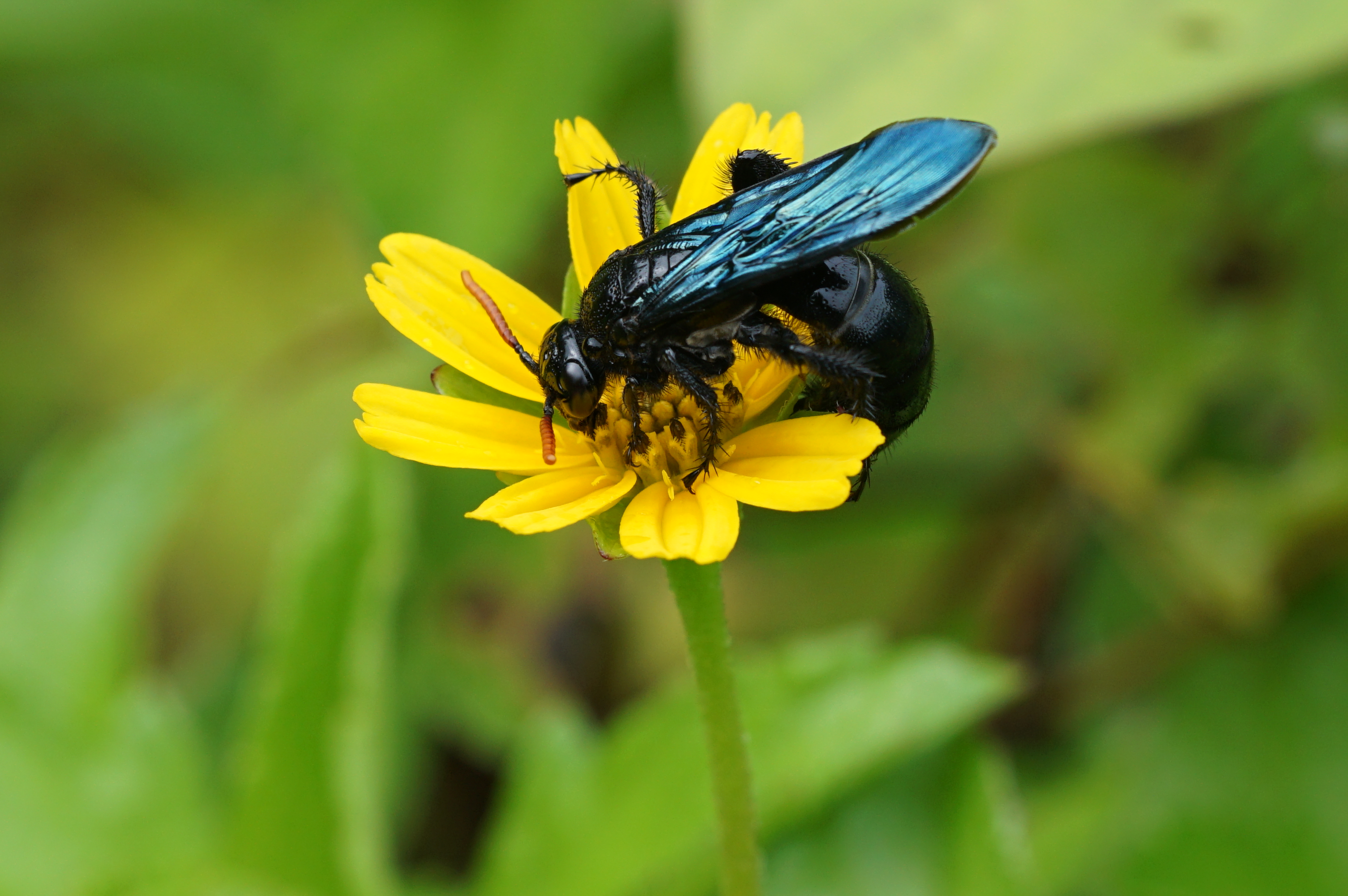

Scientific classification
- Kingdom: Animalia
- Phylum: Arthropoda
- Clade: Pancrustacea
- Class: Insecta
- Order: Hymenoptera
- Family: Scoliidae
- Genus: Scolia
- Species: S. affinis

Binomial name
- Scolia affinis Guérin-Méneville, 1830

= Scolia affinis =

Species of scoliid wasp

Scolia affinis is a species of scoliid wasp. They have black bodies and dark blue wings.

S. affinis wasps have been recorded parasitizing the chafer grub, Holotrichia consanquinea.

When a female is ready to mate, she alights and waits to be approached by a following male. After mating, the female feeds on nectar, then searches the soil for hosts.
