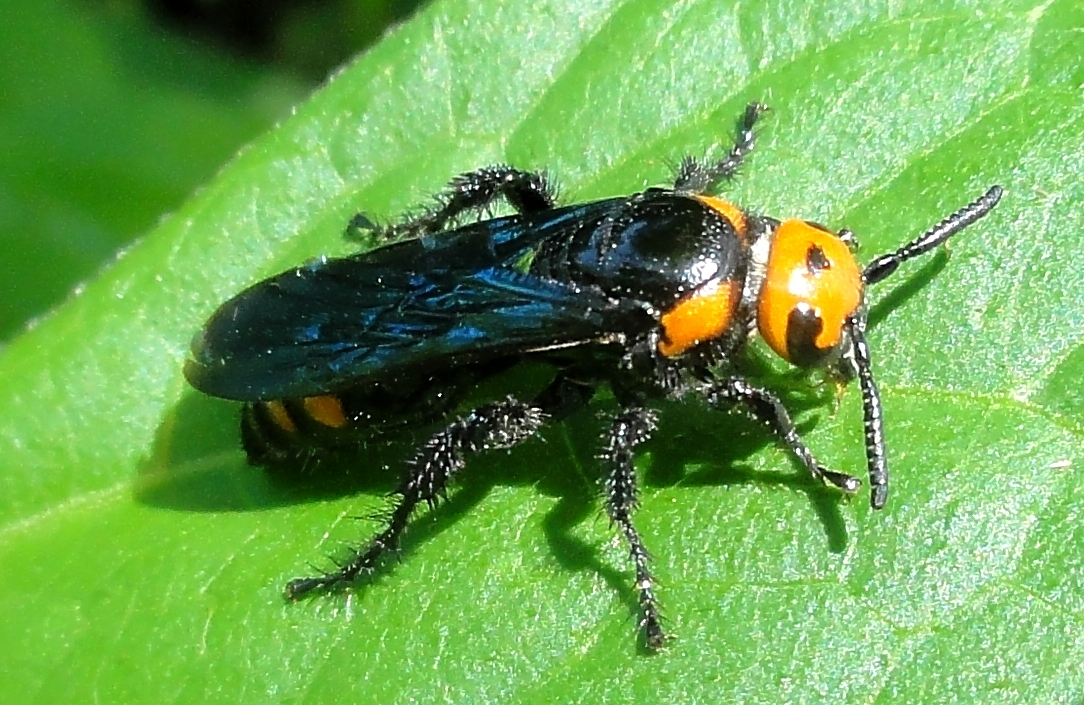

Scientific classification
- Kingdom: Animalia
- Phylum: Arthropoda
- Clade: Pancrustacea
- Class: Insecta
- Order: Hymenoptera
- Family: Scoliidae
- Genus: Scolia
- Species: S. binotata

Binomial name
- Scolia binotata Fabricius, 1804

= Scolia binotata =

Species of scoliid wasps

Scolia binotata is a species of scoliid wasps.

== Description ==
Scolia binotata wasps have variable coloration. "In both sexes, the head, scapulae, and metasomal tergites may be [entirely black or marked with red]" or orange.

== Range ==
Scolia binotata wasps are found throughout Asia, including in China, Taiwan, Hong Kong, India, Sri Lanka, Japan, Bhutan, Myanmar, Malaysia, Laos, and Vietnam.

== Subspecies ==
Scolia binotata contains the following subspecies:

- Scolia binotata binotata Fabricius, 1804
