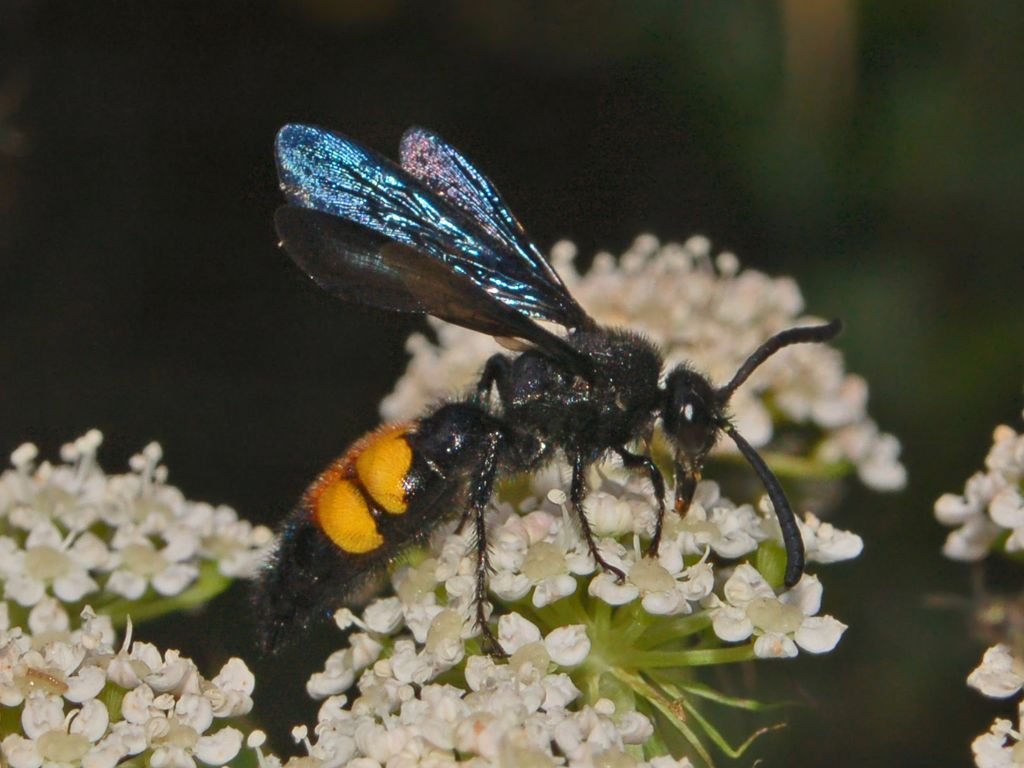
- Male
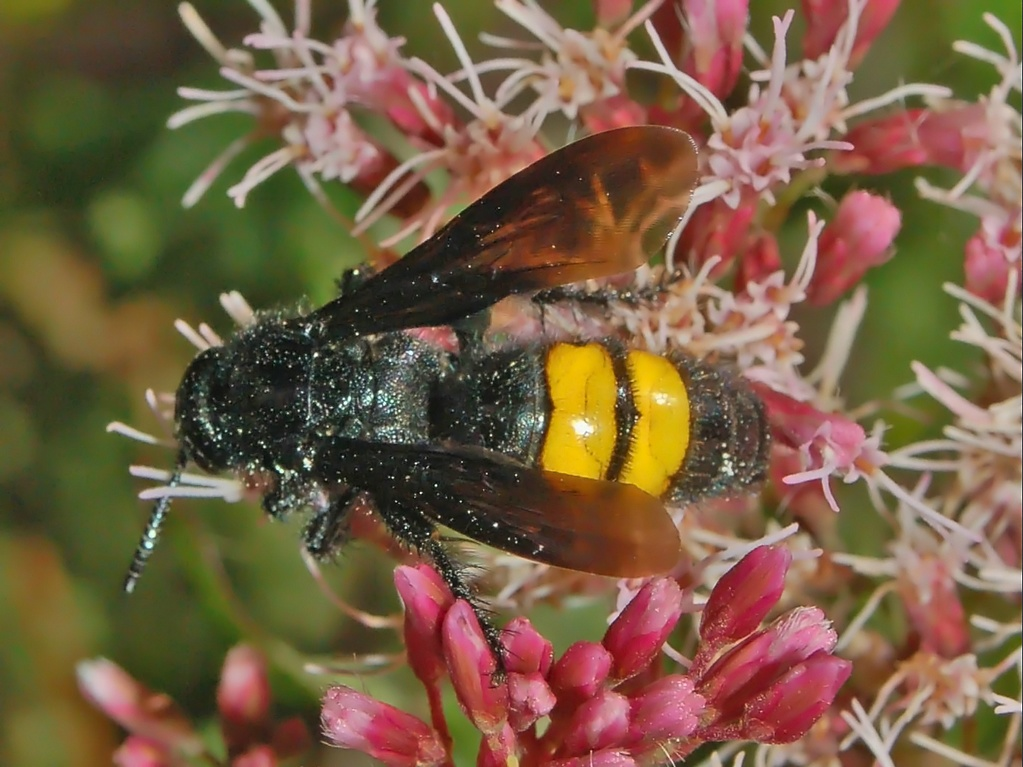
- Female

Scientific classification
- Kingdom: Animalia
- Phylum: Arthropoda
- Class: Insecta
- Order: Hymenoptera
- Family: Scoliidae
- Genus: Scolia
- Species: S. hirta

Binomial name
- Scolia hirta (Schrank, 1781)

Synonyms
- Apis hirta Schrank, 1781

= Scolia hirta =

Species of wasp

Scolia hirta is a species of wasp in the subfamily Scoliinae of the family Scoliidae.

== Distribution ==
This species is present in most of mediterranean and central Europe, in the eastern Palearctic realm, in the Near East, and in North Africa.

== Description ==
The adults grow up to 10–25 millimetres (0.39–0.98 in) long, the body is completely black, with two glossy yellow stripes on the abdomen. The wings have a smoky-dark color, with blue reflexes. Antennae of males - composed of 13 segments - are longer than in females (12 segments ). Moreover males have three large spines at the tip of their abdomen.

This species is rather similar to Scolia sexmaculata, which had two or three yellow spots instead of two yellow stripes.

== Biology ==
They can be encountered from July through September feeding on flowers, with a preference for flowers appearing cyan or blue to wasp's eyes and for composite flowers or aggregated inflorescences.

Among the most visited families there are Caprifoliaceae (Knautia arvensis), Asteraceae (Jacobaea vulgaris, Solidago canadensis, Solidago virgaurea, Centaurea scabiosa, Echinops spp.), Lamiaceae (Thymus serpyllum, Pycnanthemum spp.), Crassulaceae and Liliaceae. Furthermore they also visit Veronica spicata (Scrophulariaceae), Eryngium planum (Apiaceae), Jasione montana (Campanulaceae).

The females of these massive solitary wasps dig in search of larvae of scarab beetles (notably Cetoniinae species, especially Cetonia aurata). Then they sting the scarab larva, injecting venom that causes permanent paralysis, and subsequently lay an egg on them, which later hatches, and the larvae consumes the paralyzed scarab.

== Subspecies ==
The following two subspecies are described:

- Scolia hirta hirta (Schrank, 1781)
- Scolia hirta unifasciata Cyrillo, 1787 (in Corsica, Sicily and Malta)
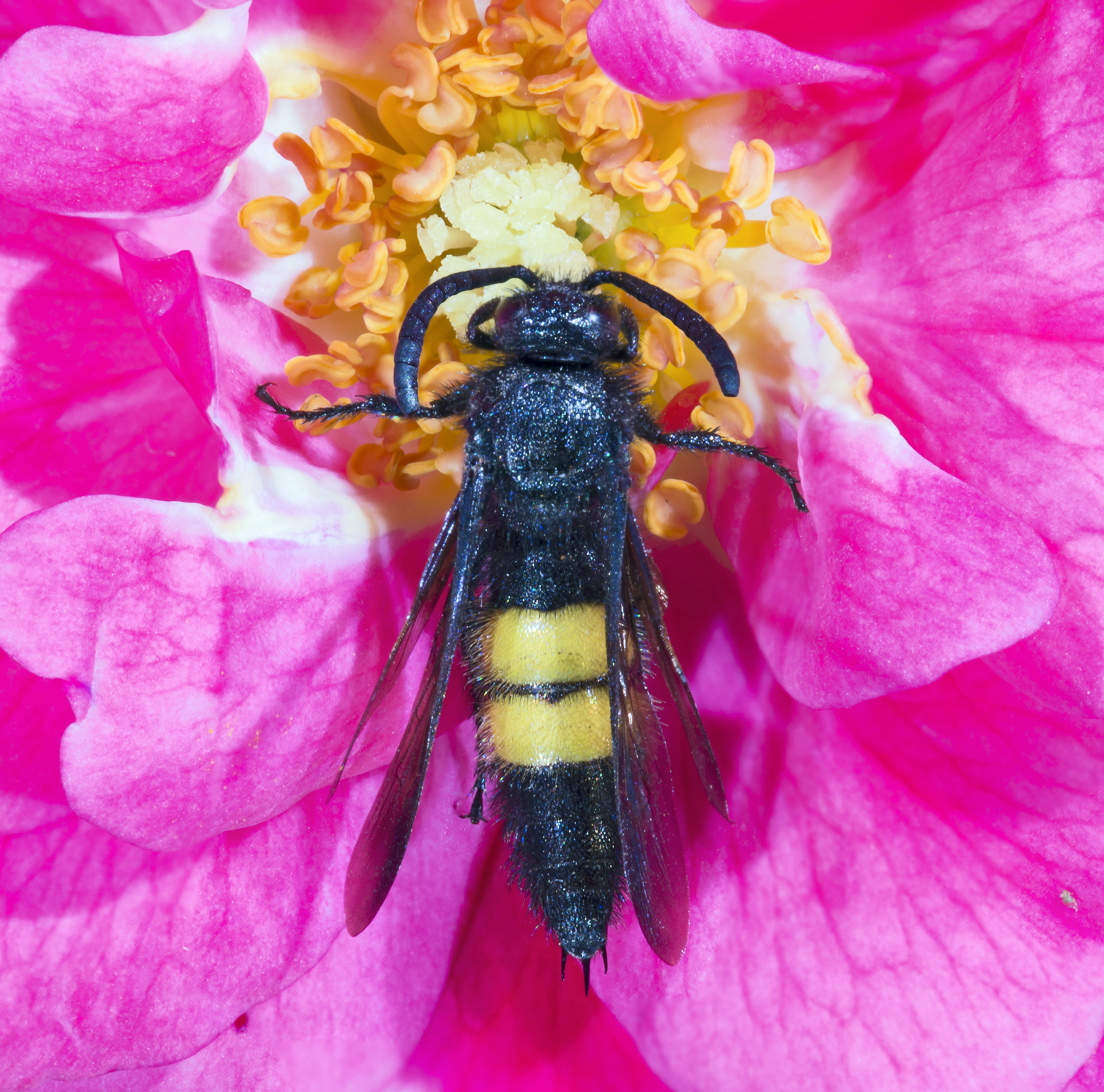
S. h. hirta

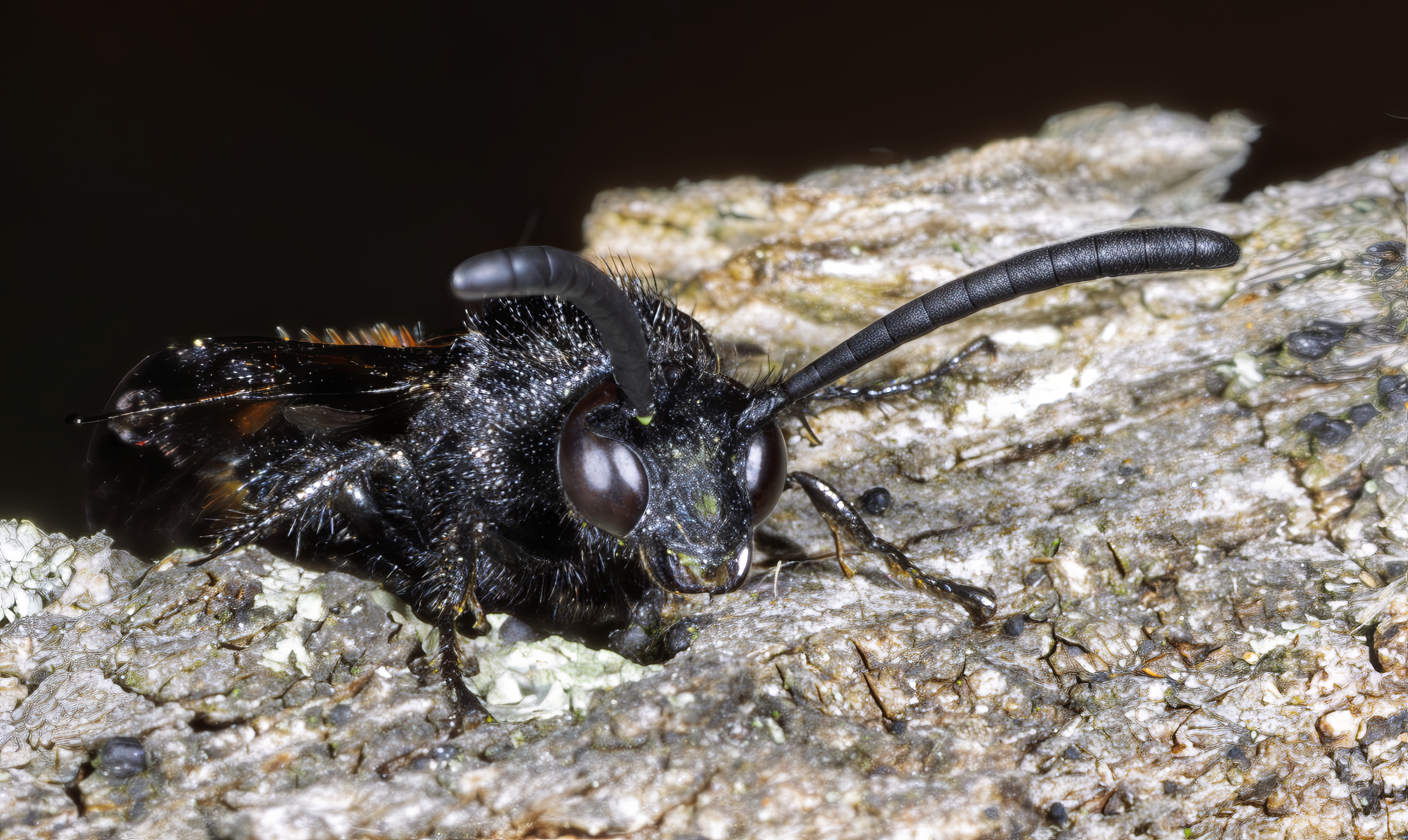
S. h. hirta - Portrait
