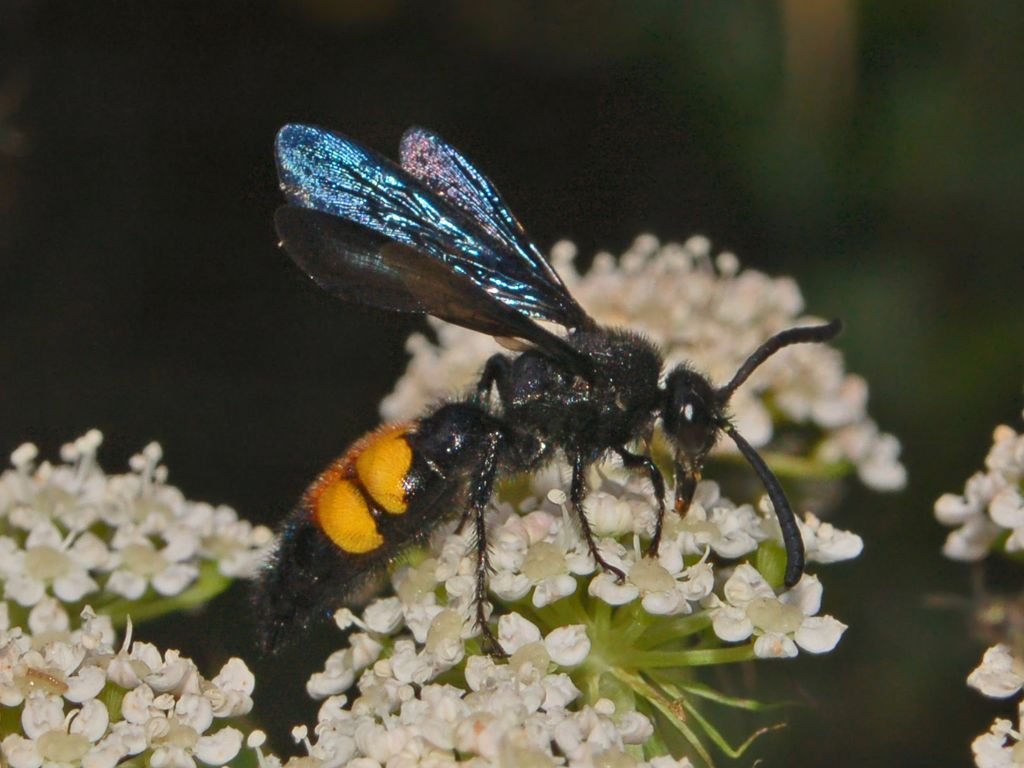
- Scolia hirta hirta

Scientific classification
- Kingdom: Animalia
- Phylum: Arthropoda
- Clade: Pancrustacea
- Class: Insecta
- Order: Hymenoptera
- Family: Scoliidae
- Tribe: Scoliini
- Genus: Scolia; Fabricius, 1775

Type species
- Scolia sexmaculata (Müller, 1766)

= Scolia (wasp) =

Genus of wasps

Scolia is a genus of scoliid wasps in the subfamily Scoliinae. There are 261 described species in Scolia.

== Taxonomy and phylogeny ==
Scolia was described by Johan Christian Fabricius in 1775. This genus is classified under the tribe Scoliini of the subfamily Scoliinae within the family Scoliidae. Scolia is itself divided into three subgenera, Scolia (Scolia), and Scolia (Discolia), and Scolia (Hesperoscolia). Males of the subgenus Scolia (Scolia) have dense, silky setae on the volsella, while those of the subgenus Scolia (Discolia) lack dense setae on the volsella.

== Description and identification ==
Scolia are small to medium wasps between 5–25 millimetres (0.20–0.98 in). The forewing has a single recurrent vein and two submarginal cells. The species are usually black with variable yellow or red markings. The majority of setae are usually black or white but may also be mixed with red or yellow.

== Distribution ==
Scolia is a cosmopolitan genus. 40 species are known from India alone. Another 50 species are known from the Palearctic. 14 more species are known from the Americas.

== Species ==
The following are select species belong to the genus Scolia:

=== Subgenus Scolia (Discolia) ===
- Scolia affinis Guérin-Méneville, 1830
- Scolia albumtenebris Ramírez-Guillén, 2025
- Scolia bartletti Ramírez-Guillén, 2025
- Scolia bicincta Fabricius, 1775
- Scolia binotata Fabricius, 1804
- Scolia bnun Tsuneki, 1972
- Scolia clypeata Sickmann, 1894
- Scolia dubia (Say, 1837)
- Scolia erythropyga Burmeister, 1853
- Scolia fasciatopunctata Guerin, 1838
- Scolia guttata (Burmeister, 1853)
- Scolia hirta (Schrank, 1781)
- Scolia histrionica (Fabricius, 1787)
- Scolia kuroiwae Matsumura & Uchida, 1926
- Scolia mexicana (Saussure, 1858)
- Scolia nobilis Saussure, 1858
- Scolia nobilitata (Fabricius, 1805)
- Scolia oculata Matsumura, 1911
- Scolia picteti Saussure, 1854
- Scolia rugifrons Betrem, 1928
- Scolia sinensis Saussure, 1864
- Scolia superciliaris de Saussure, 1864
- Scolia turkestanica Betrem, 1935
- Scolia verticalis (Fabricius, 1775)
- Scolia vollenhoveni de Saussure, 1859
- Scolia wahlbergii de Saussure, 1859
- Scolia watanabei Matsumura, 1912

=== Subgenus Scolia (Hesperoscolia) ===
- Scolia jucunda (de Saussure, 1858)
- Scolia rufiventris (Fabricius 1804)

=== Subgenus Scolia (Scolia) ===
- Scolia anatoliae Osten, 2004
- Scolia asiella Betrem, 1935
- Scolia carbonaria (Linnaeus, 1767)
- Scolia cypria de Saussure, 1854
- Scolia erythrocephala Fabricius, 1798
- Scolia fallax Eversmann, 1849
- Scolia flaviceps Eversmann, 1846
- Scolia fuciformis Scopoli, 1786
- Scolia galbula (Pallas, 1771)
- Scolia hortorum Fabricius, 1787
- Scolia orientalis Saussure, 1856
- Scolia sexmaculata (O. F. Müller, 1766)

=== Extinct species ===
- † Scolia distincta Zhang, 1989
- † Scolia saussureana Heer, 1865

== Gallery ==
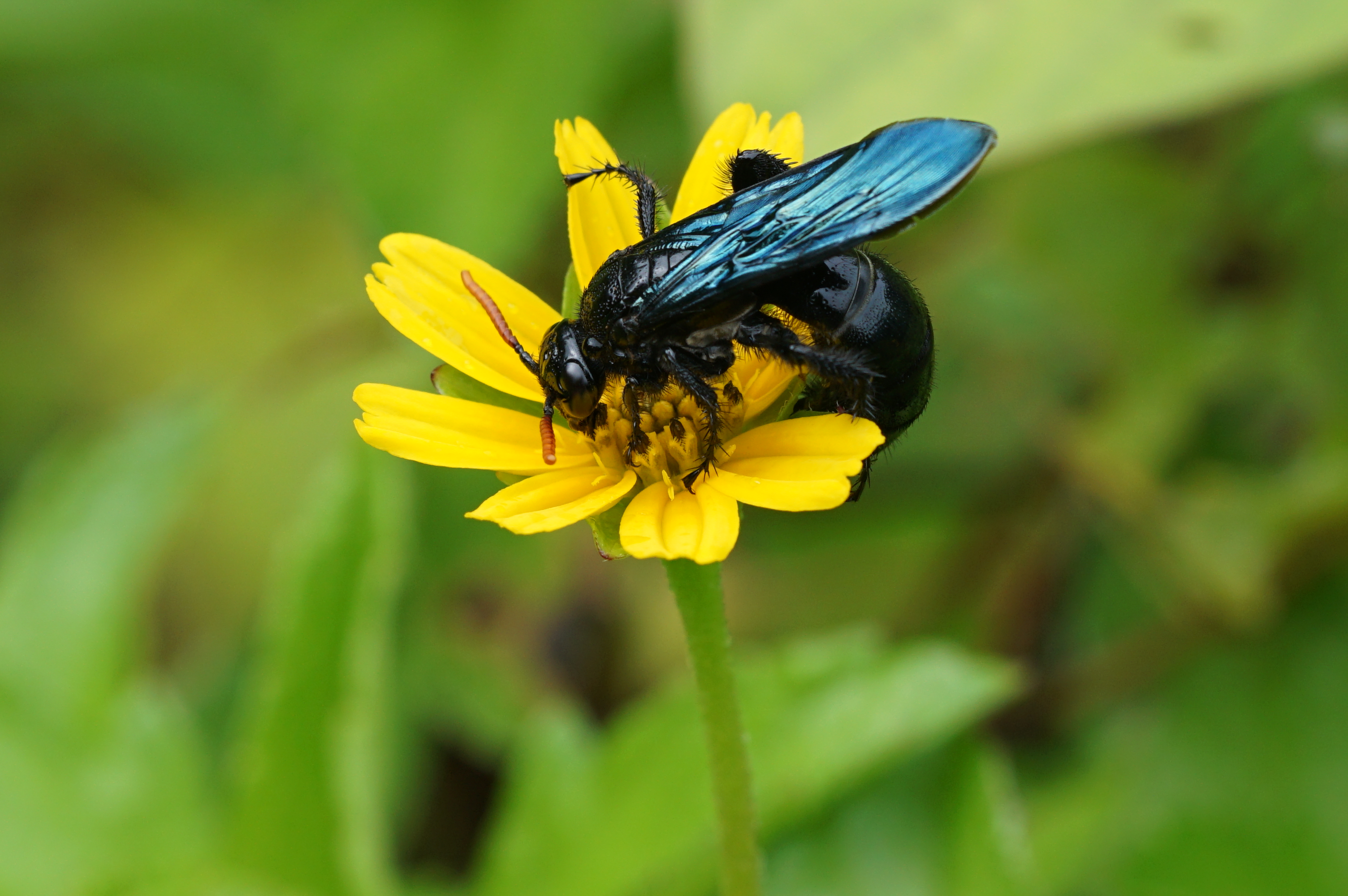
S. affinis in Kerala, India.

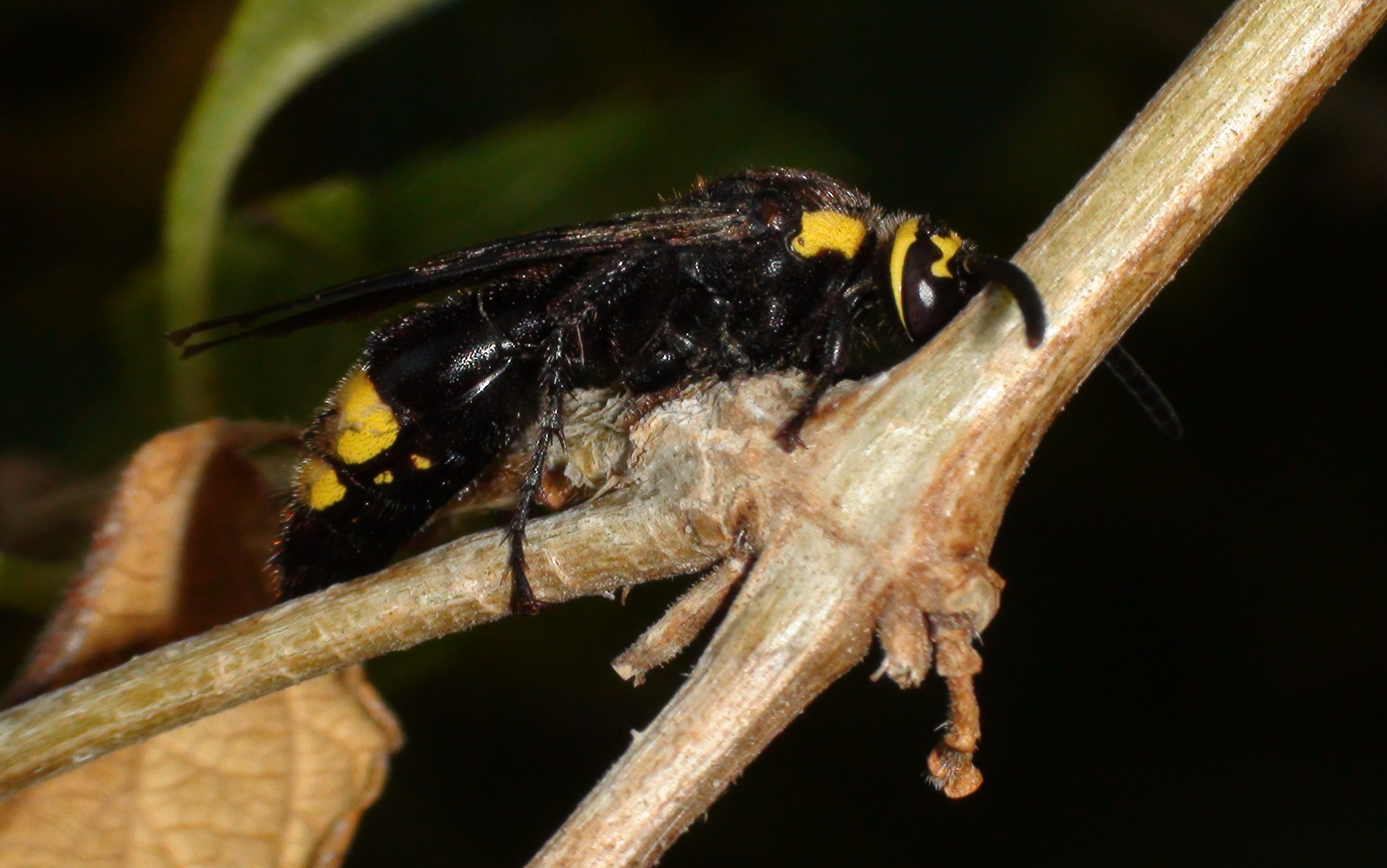
S anatoliae in Turkey.

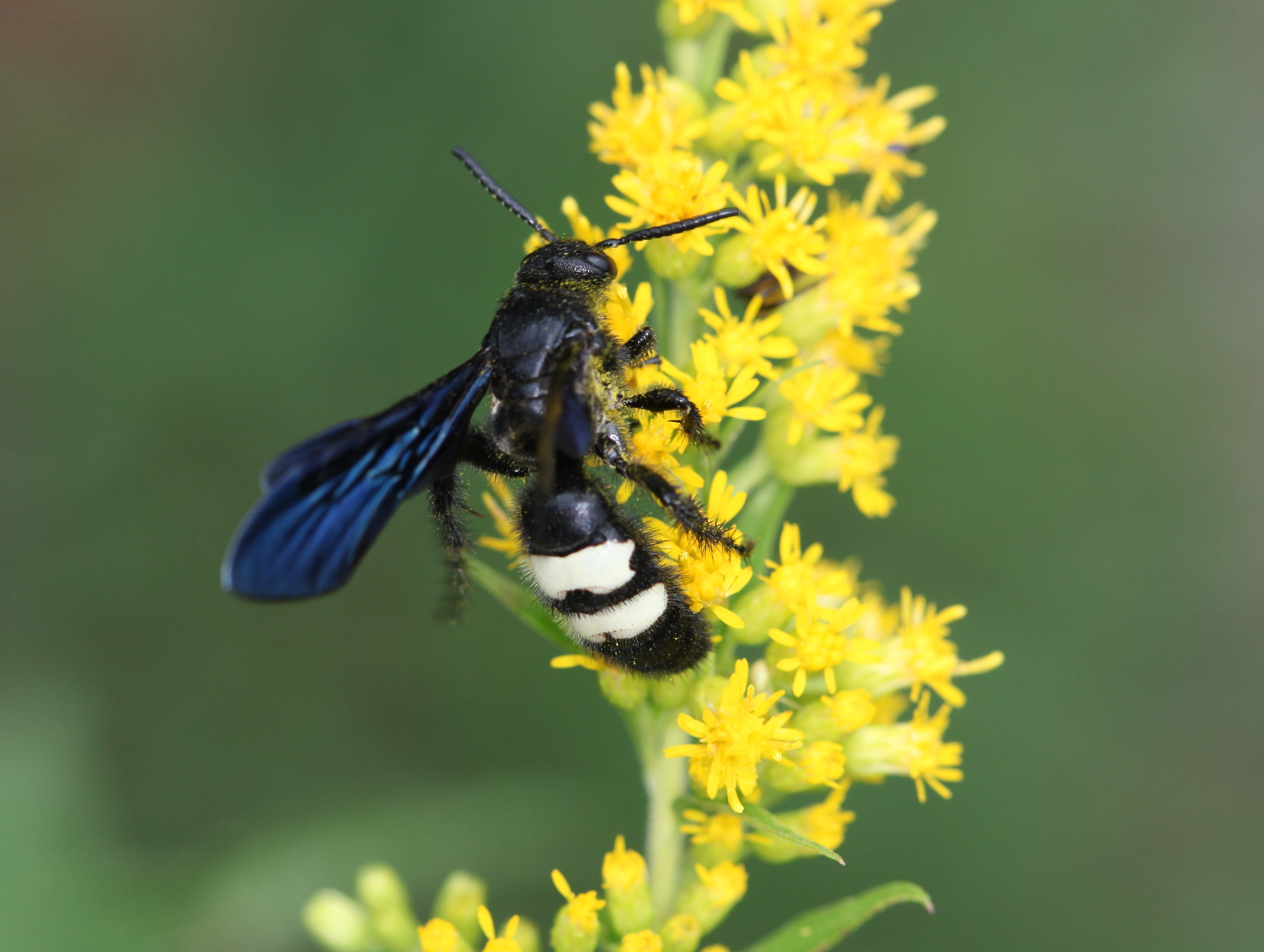
S. bicincta female in North Carolina.

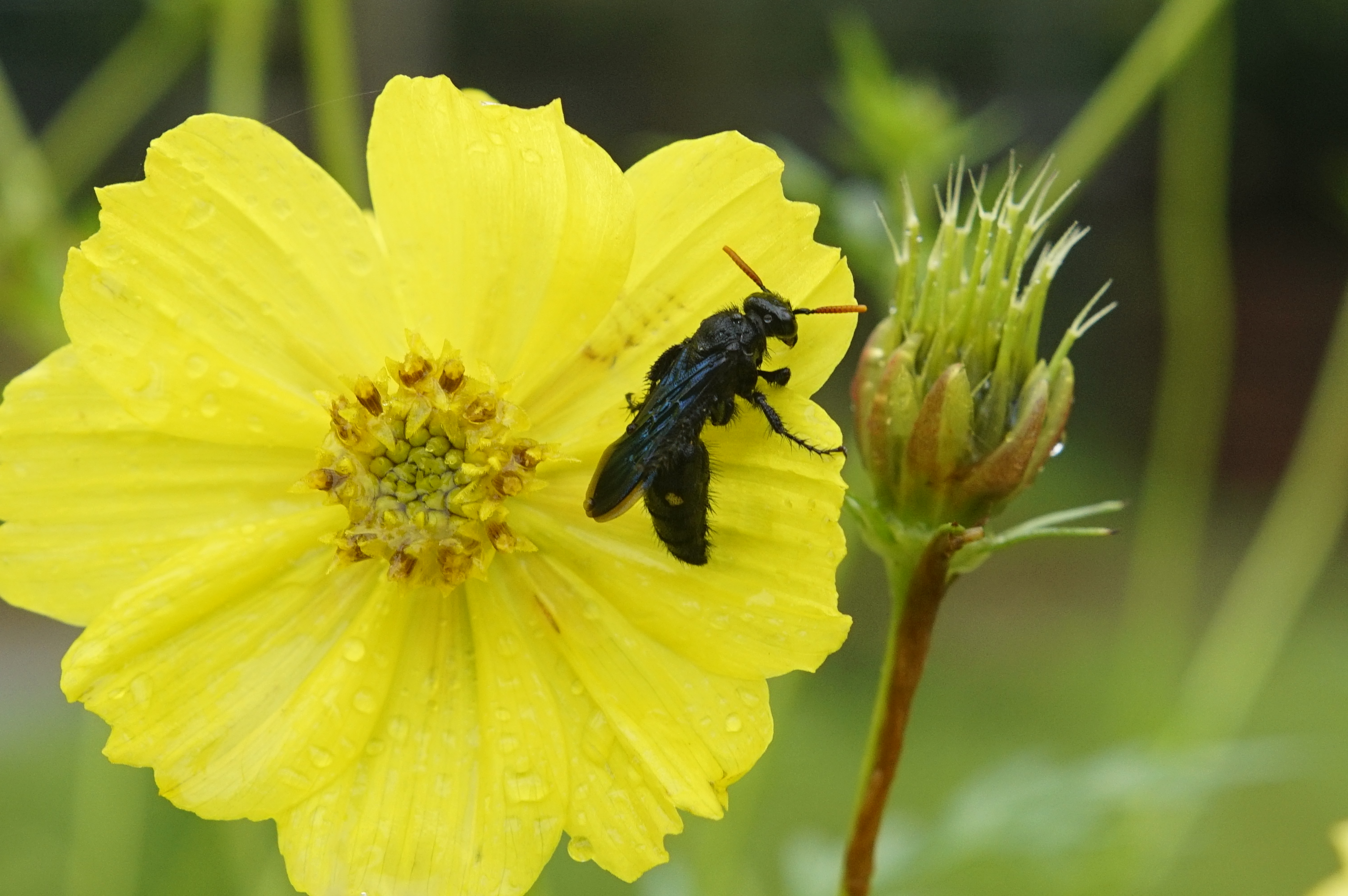
S. bilunata in Kerala, India.

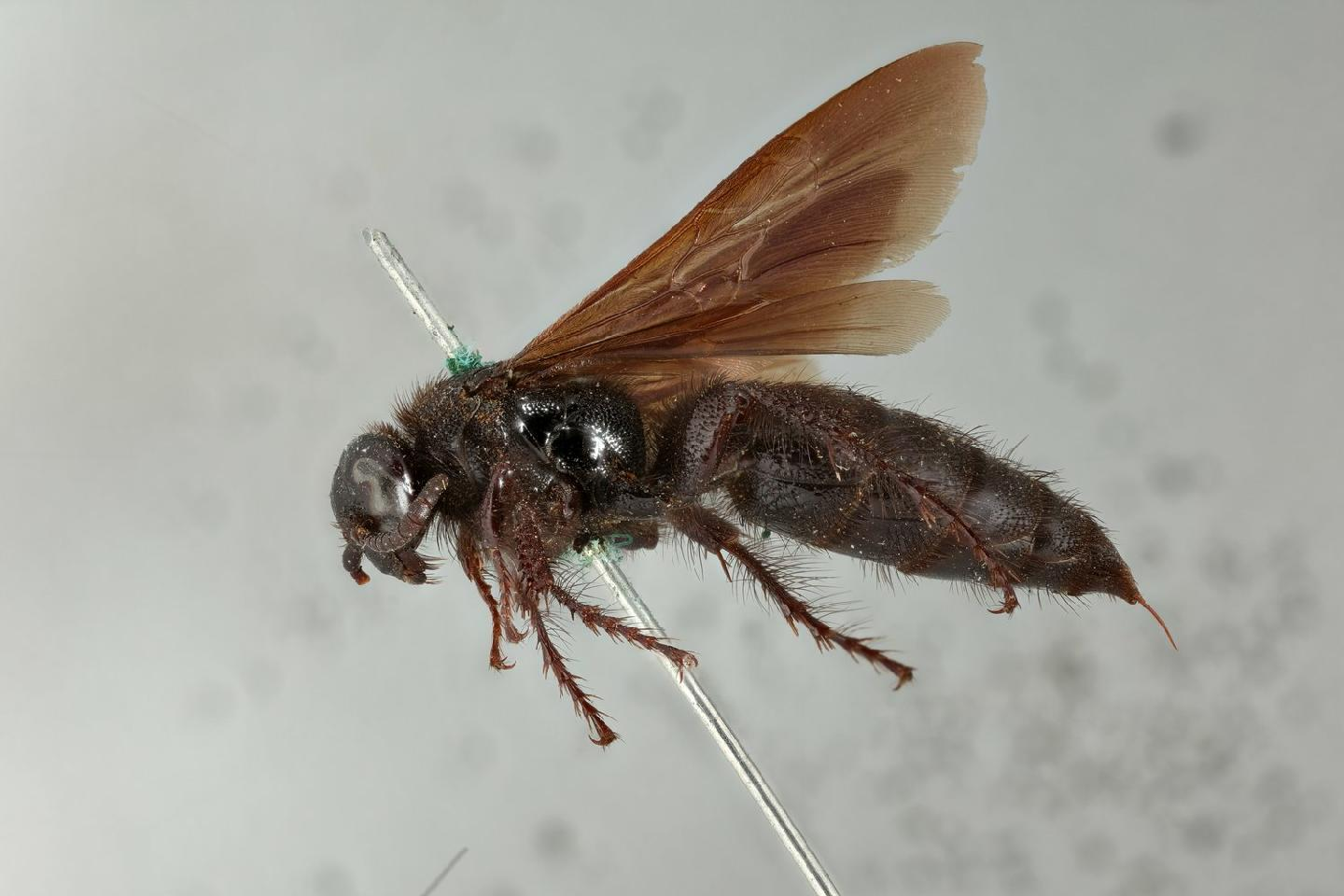
S. carbonaria collected in Algeria.

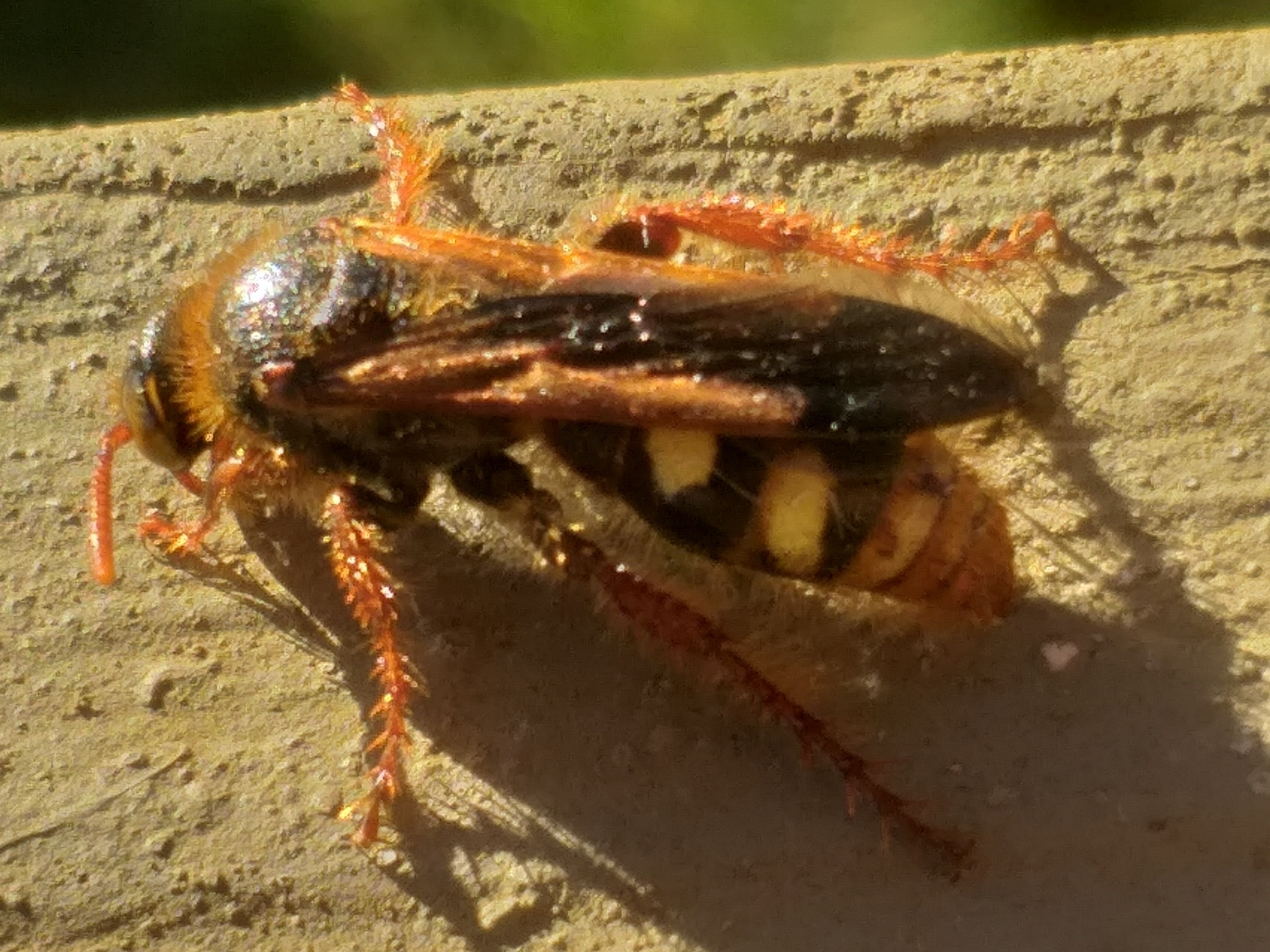
S. chrysotricha in South Africa.

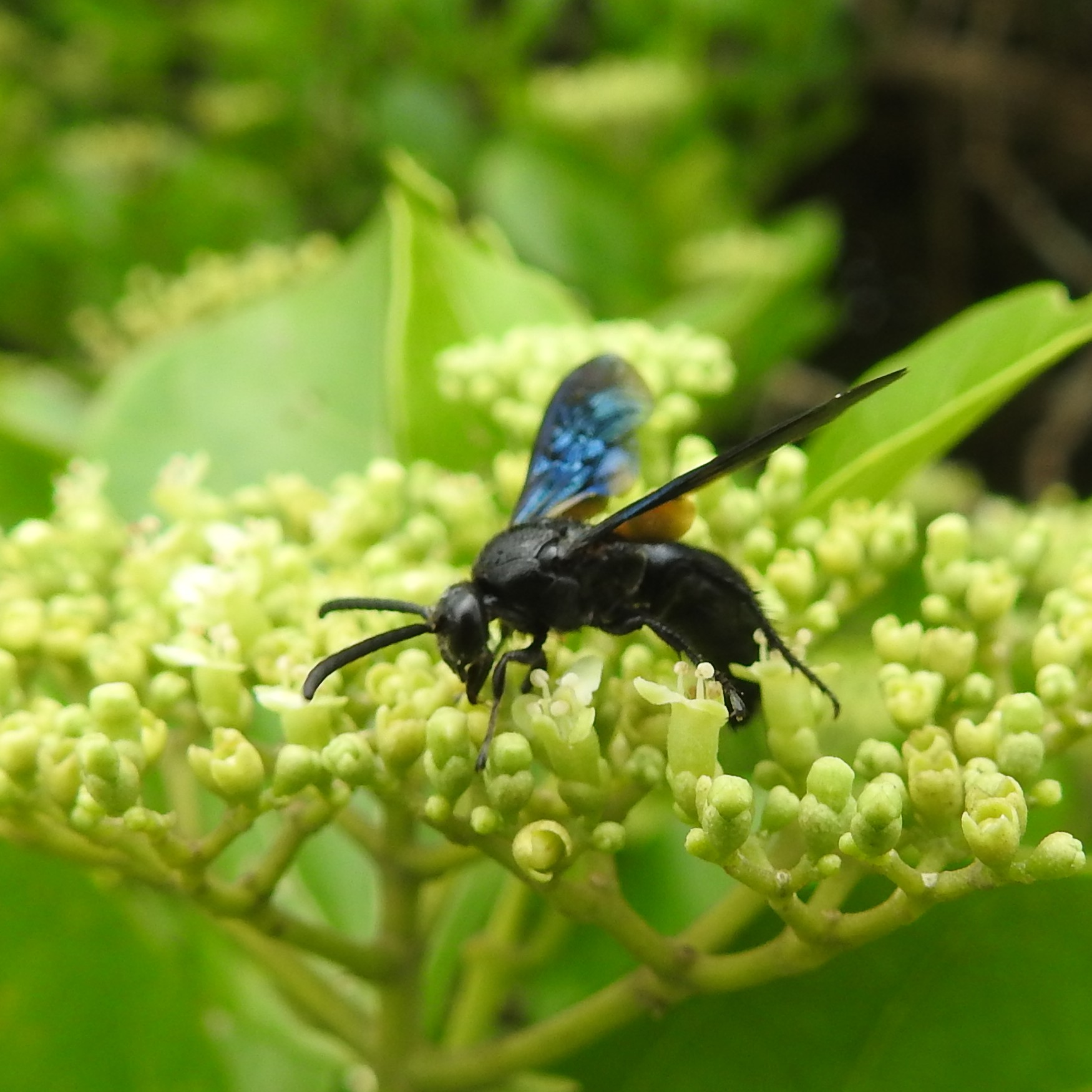
S. cyanipennis in Kerala, India.

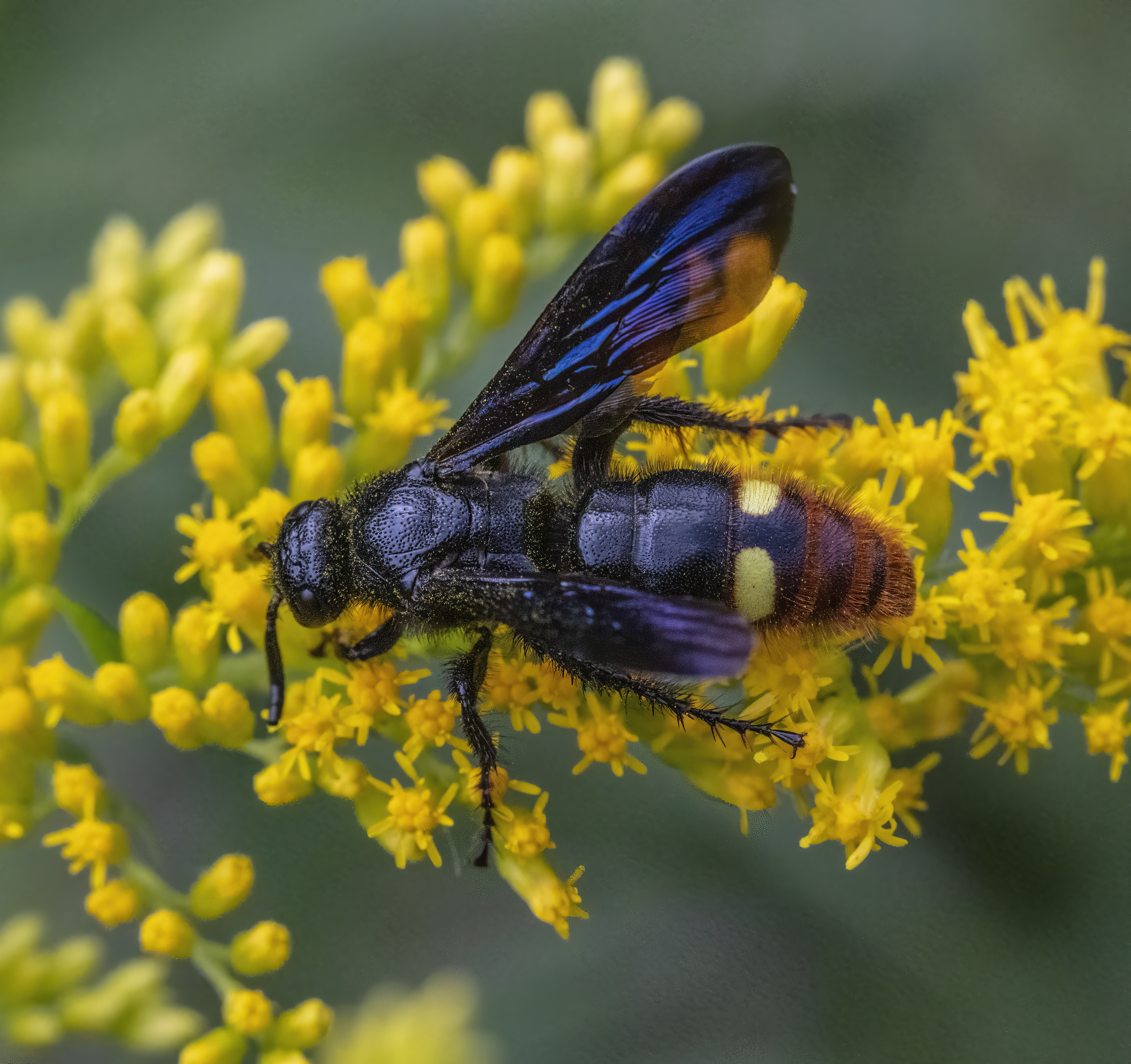
S. dubia dubia in Maryland.

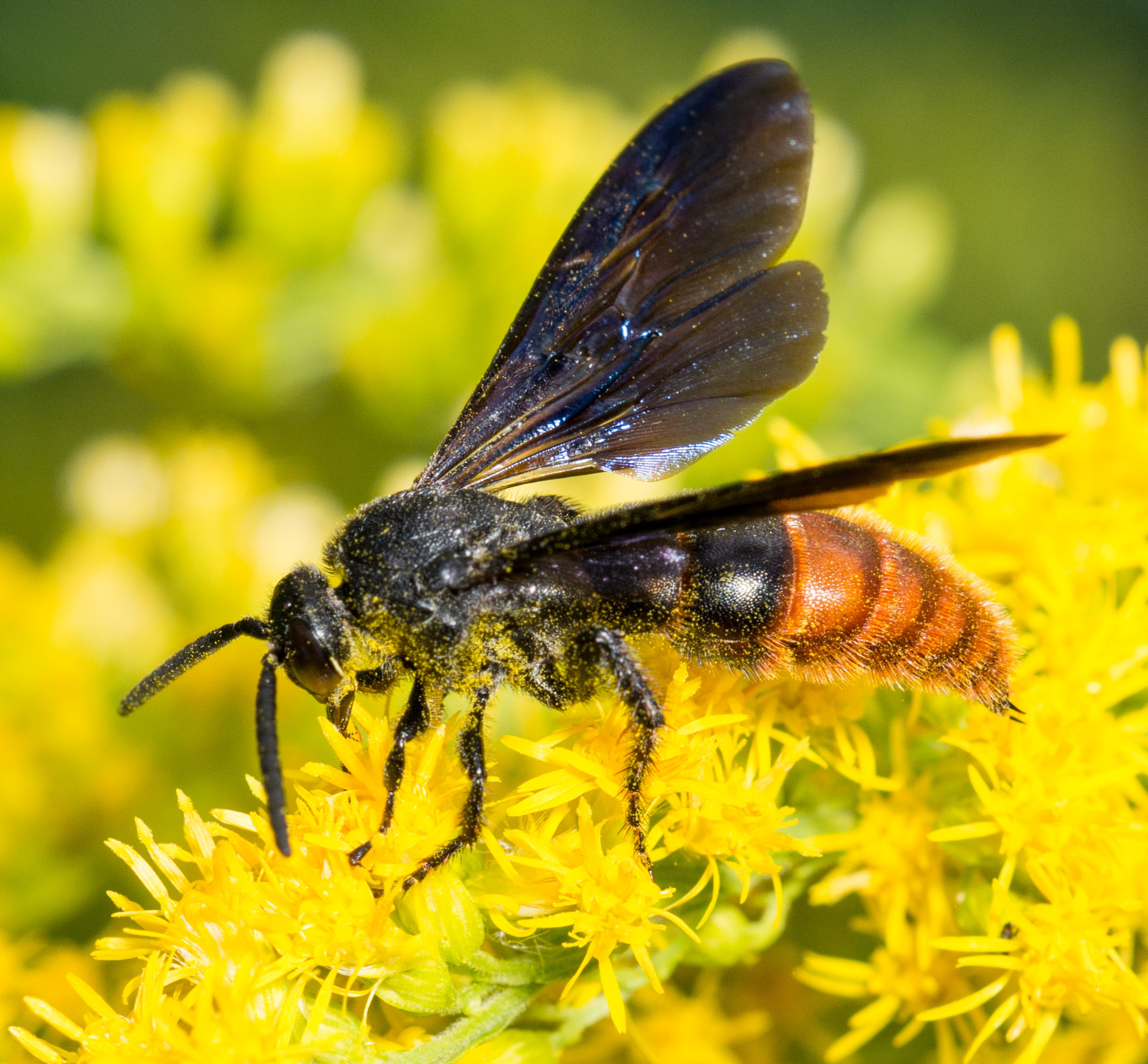
S. dubia haematodes in Texas.

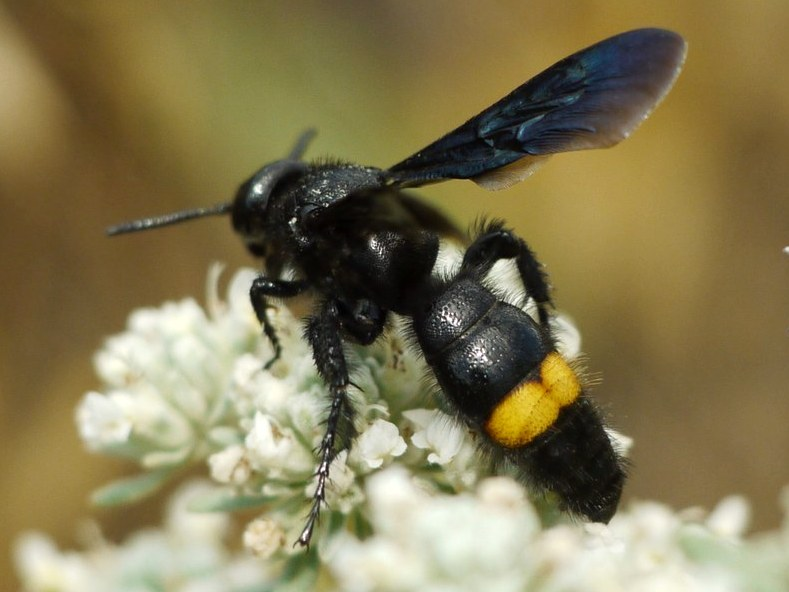
S. fallax in Ukraine.

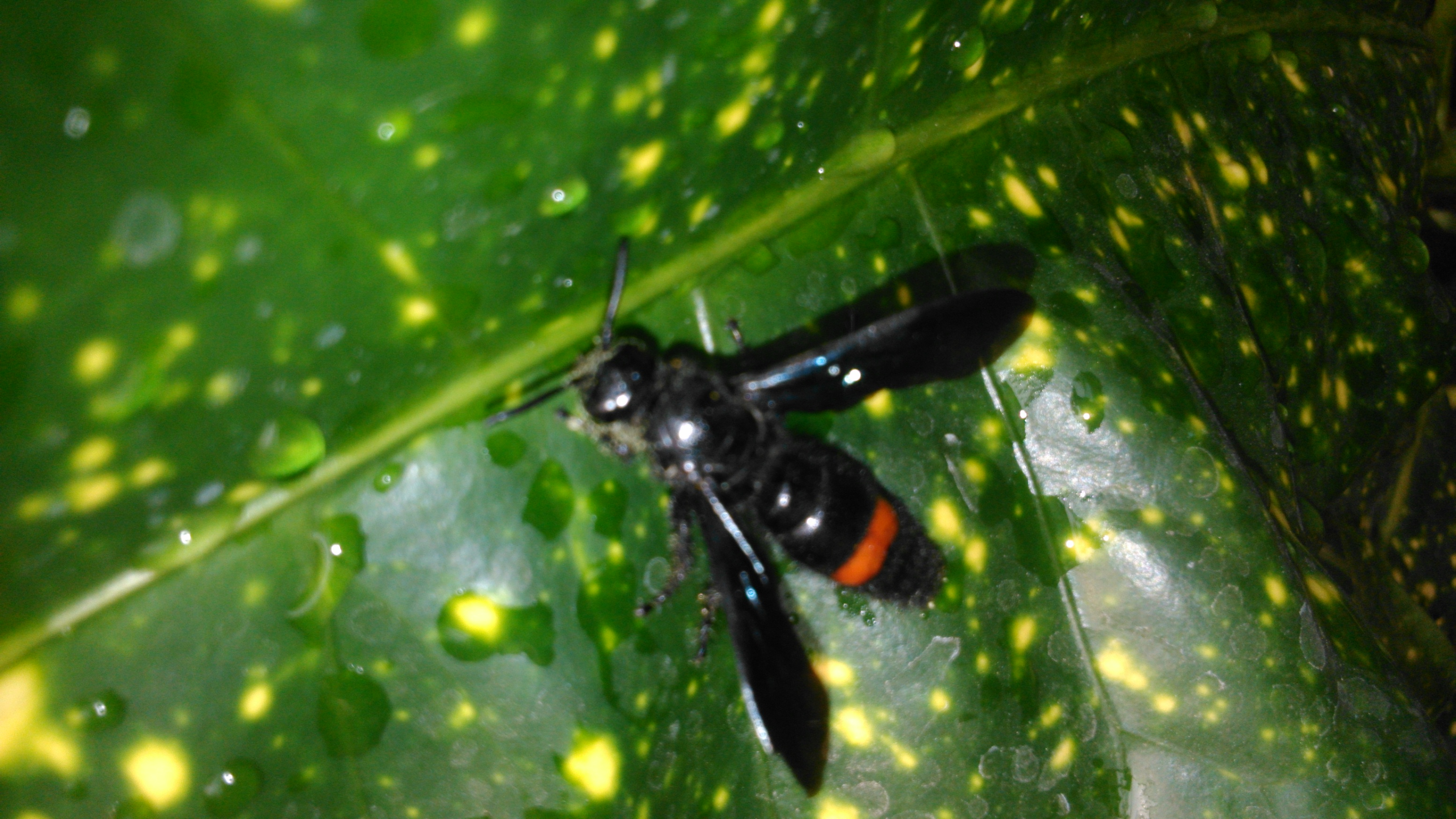
S. fasciatopunctata in India.

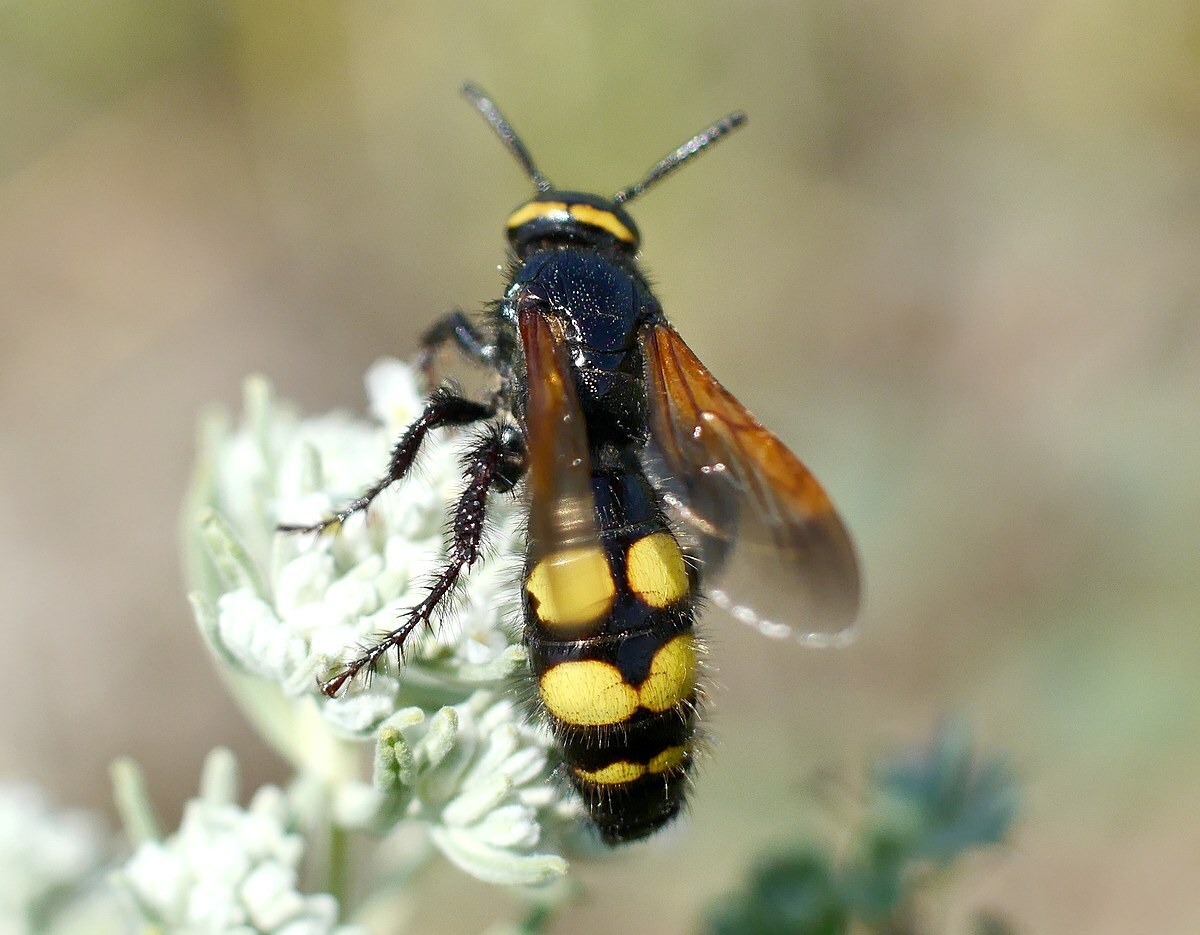
S. fuciformis in Ukraine.

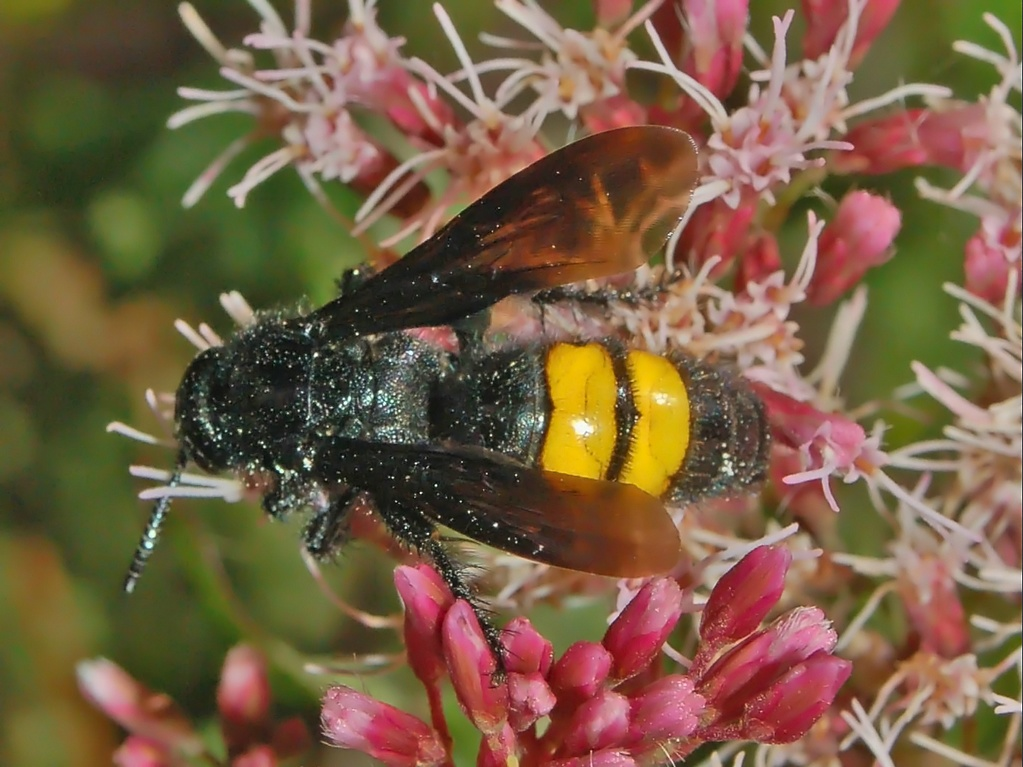
S. hirta hirta in Italy.

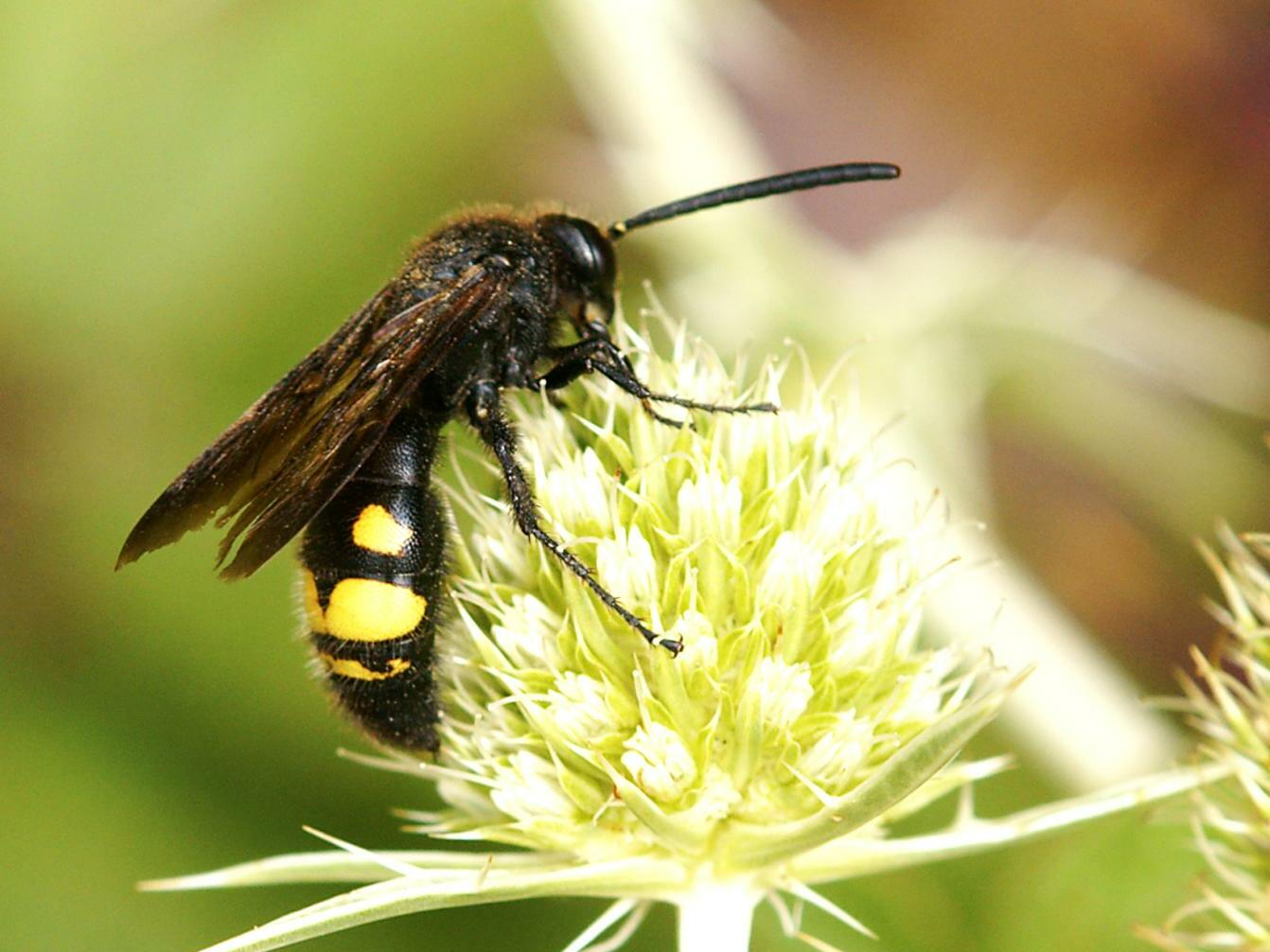
S. hortorum in Spain.

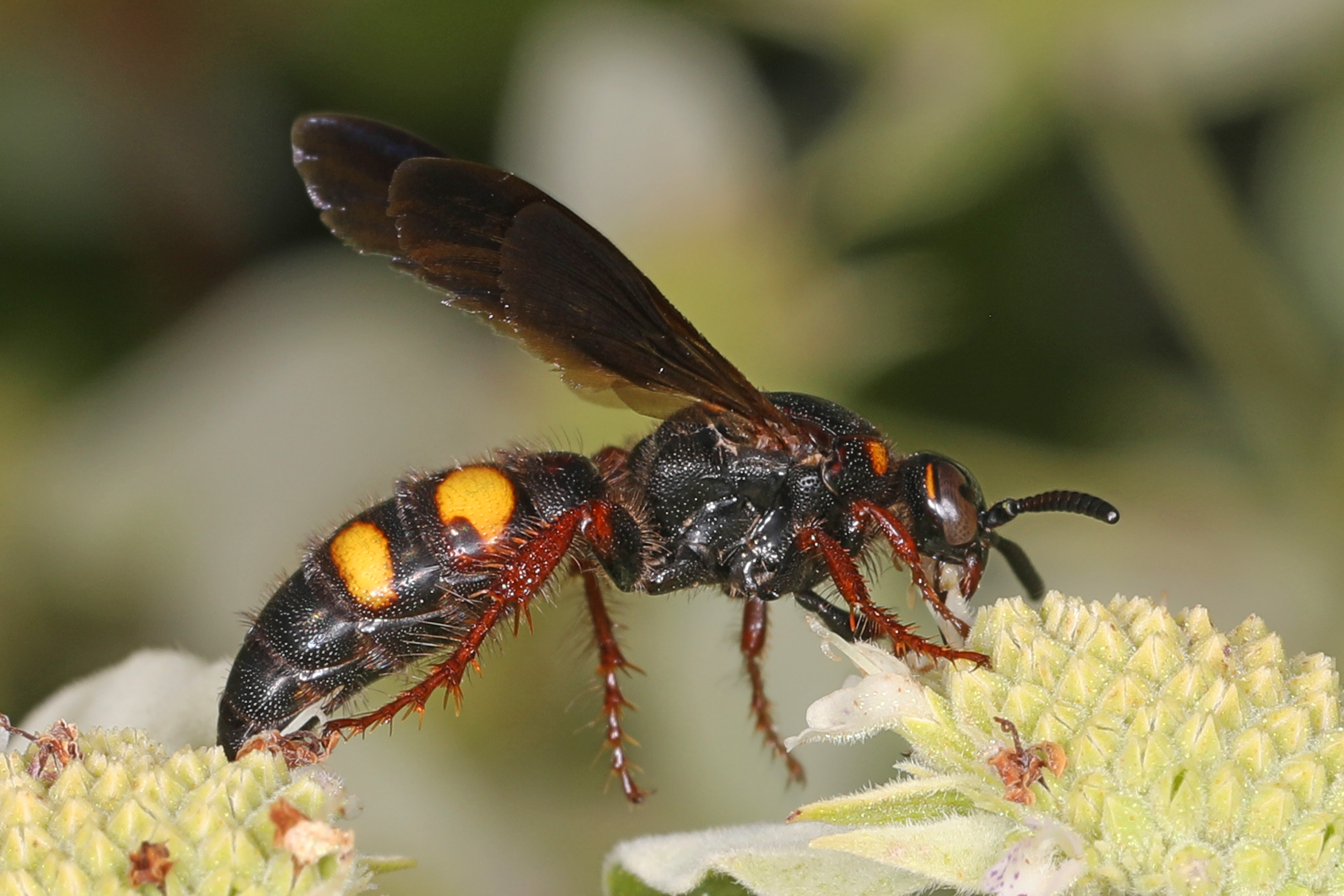
S. nobilitata notilitata in Virginia.

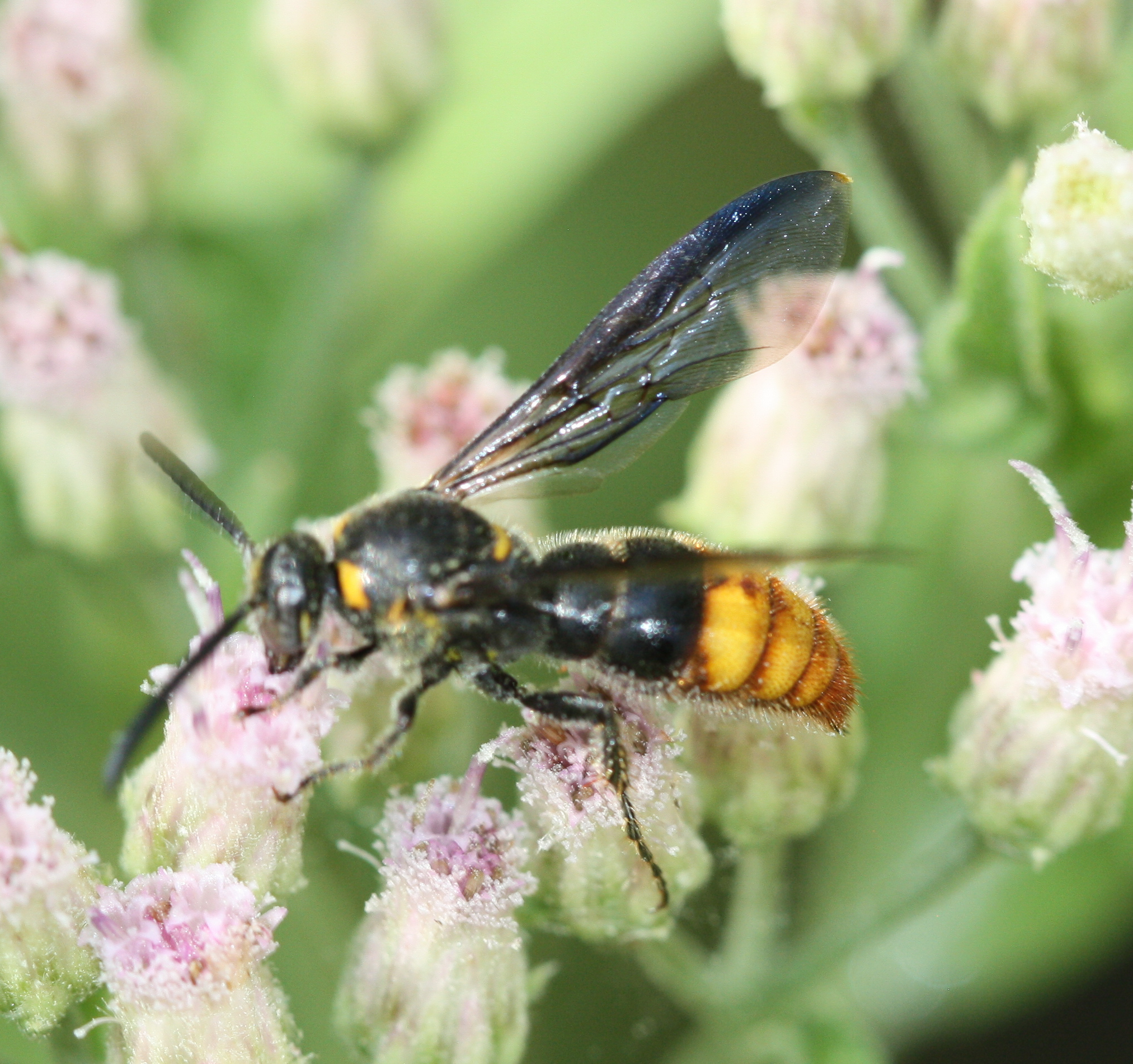
S. nobilitata otomita in Arizona.

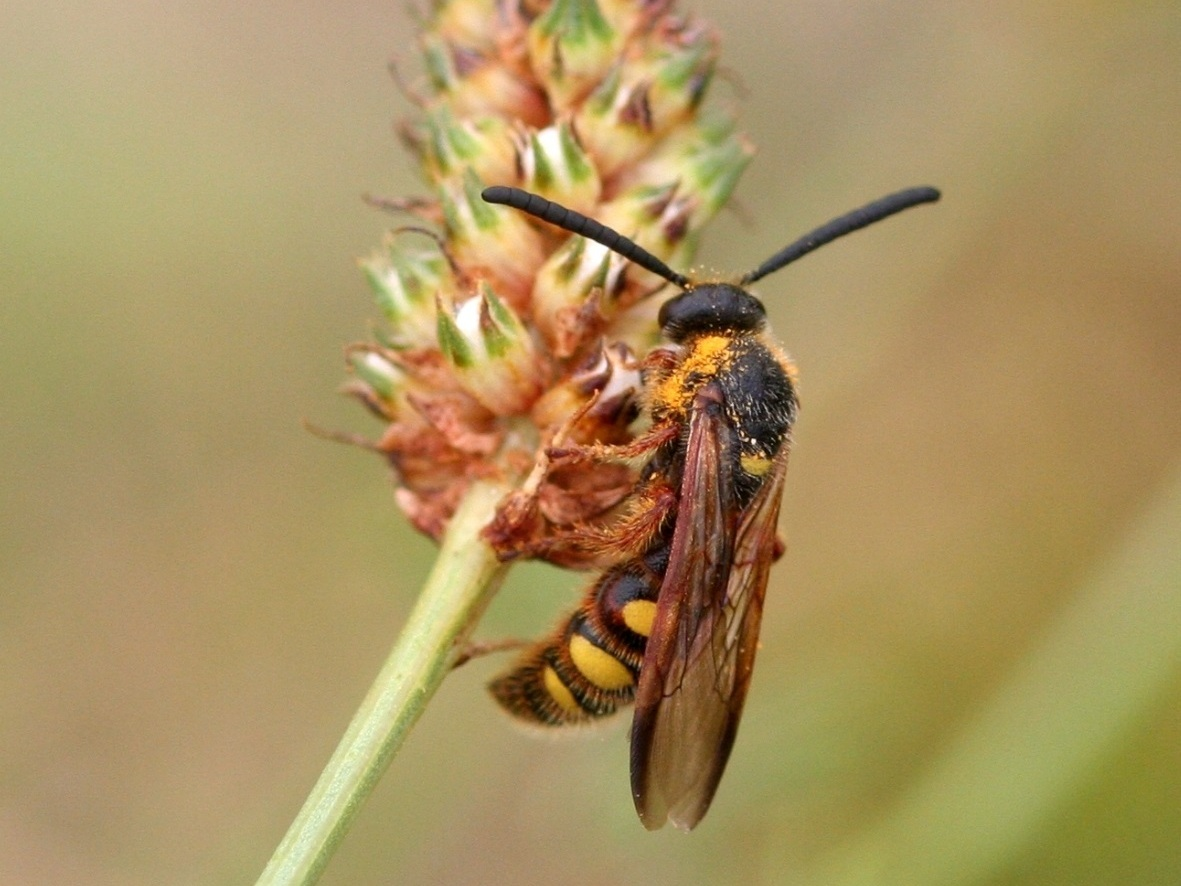
S. nobilitata tricincta male in Colorado.

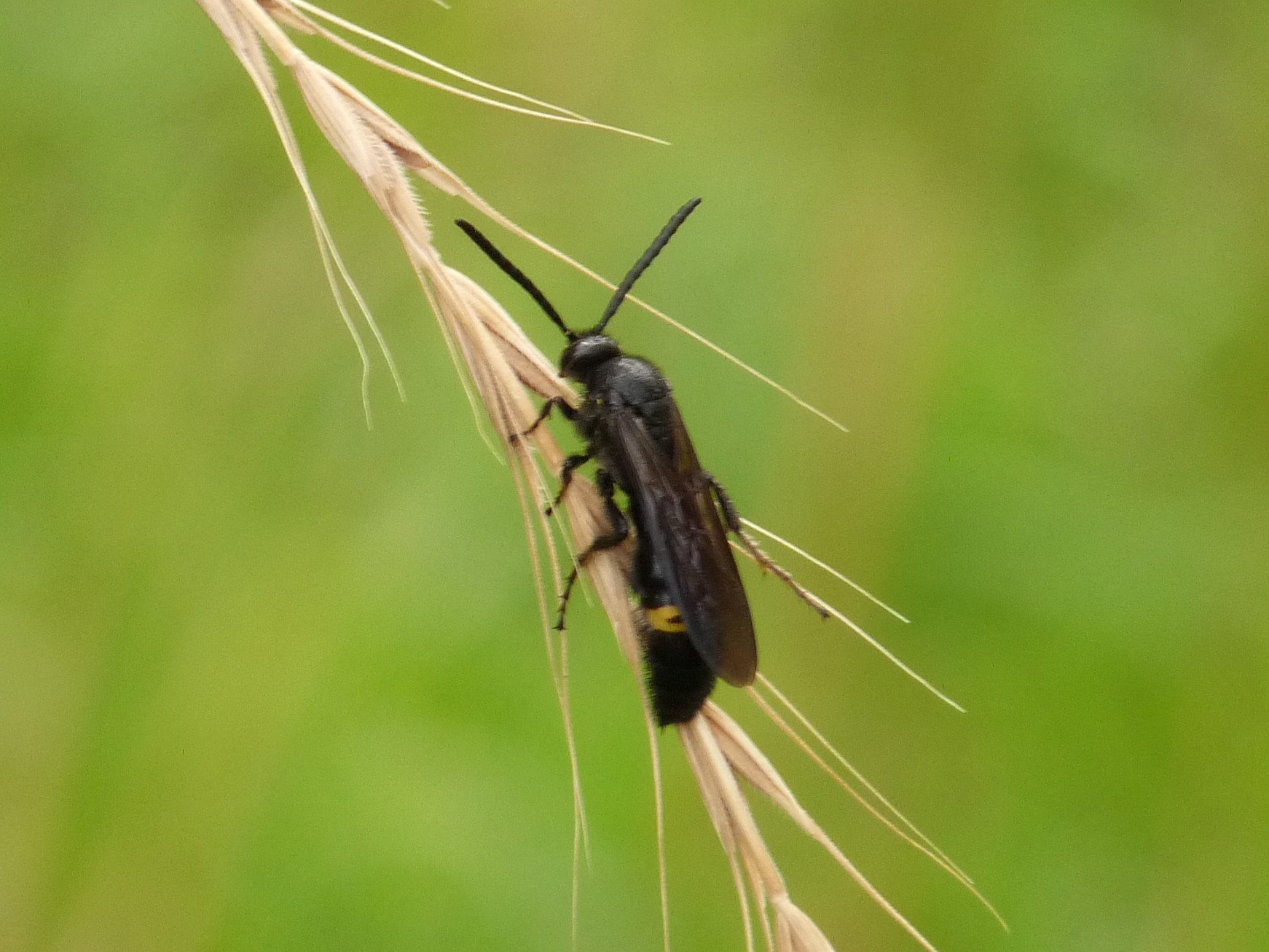
S. ocula in Japan.

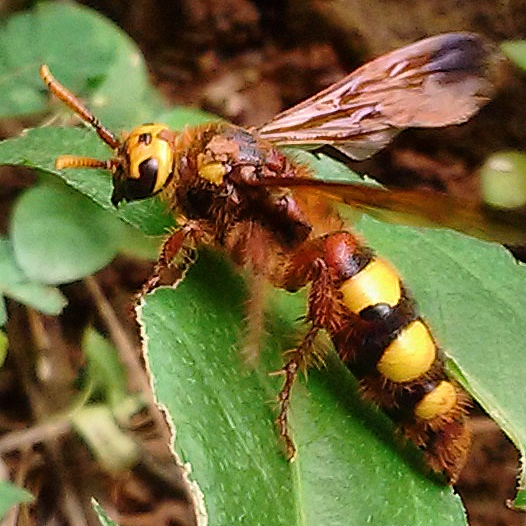
S. pictei in India.

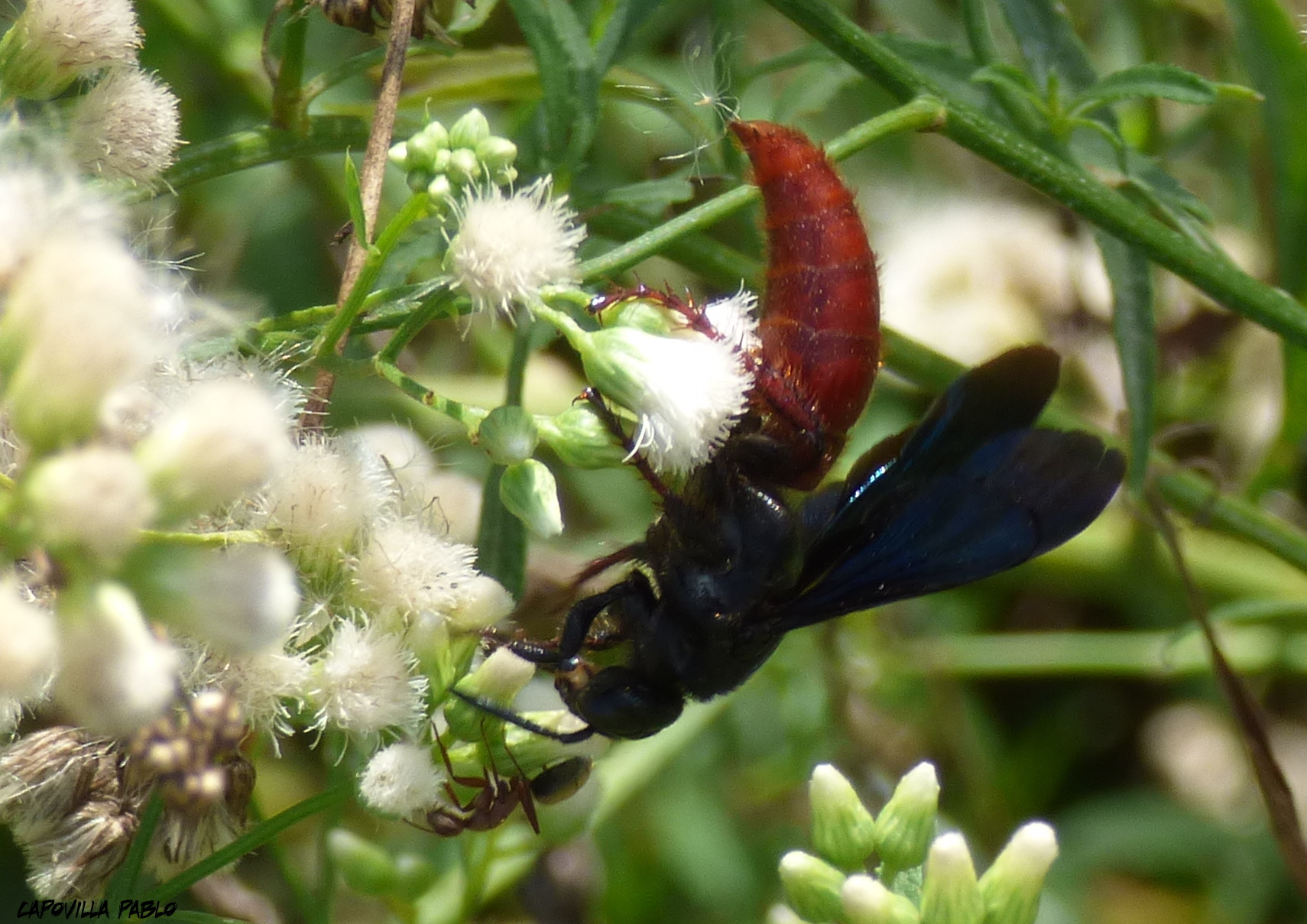
S. rufiventris in Argentina.

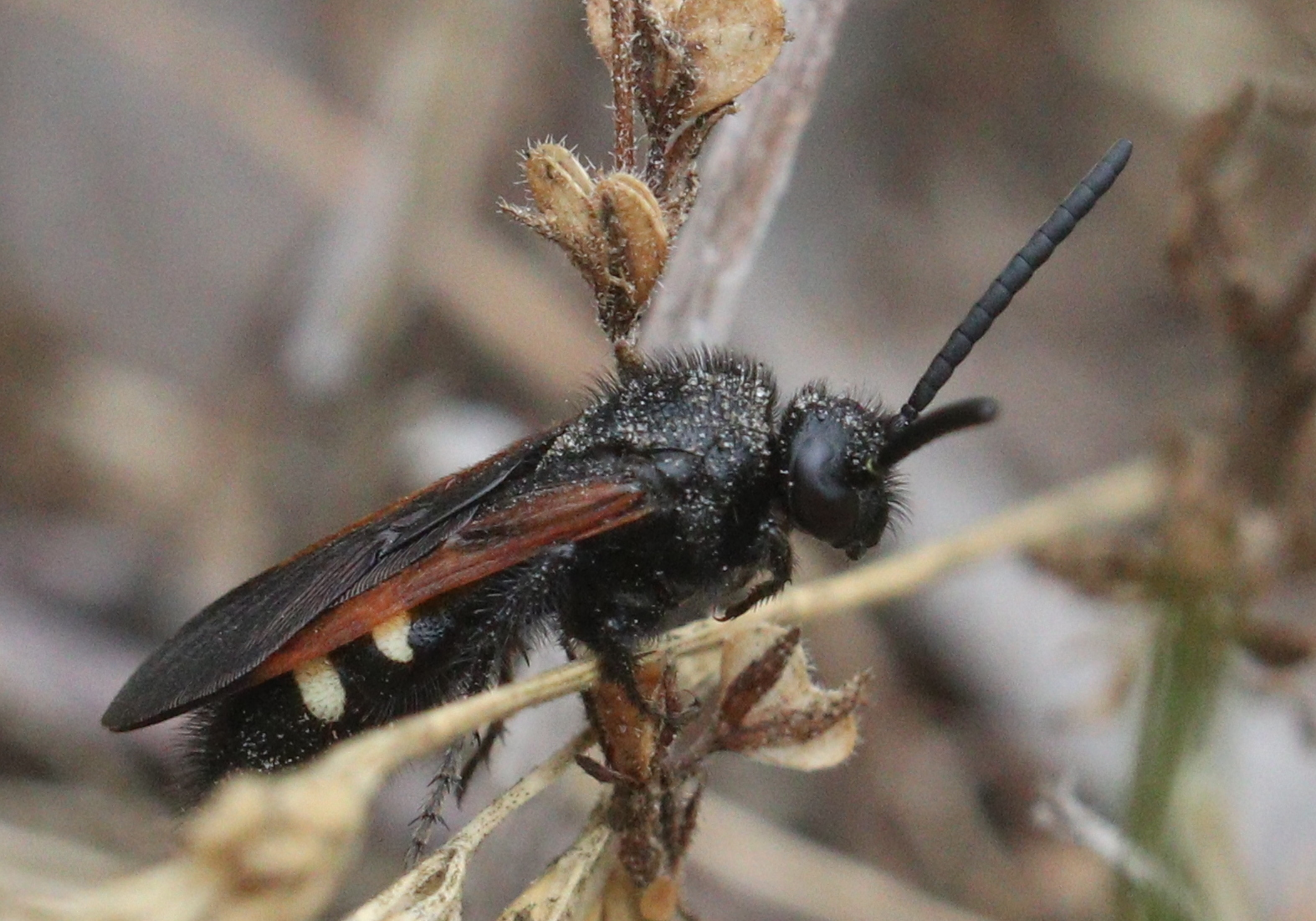
S. sexmaculata in Poland.

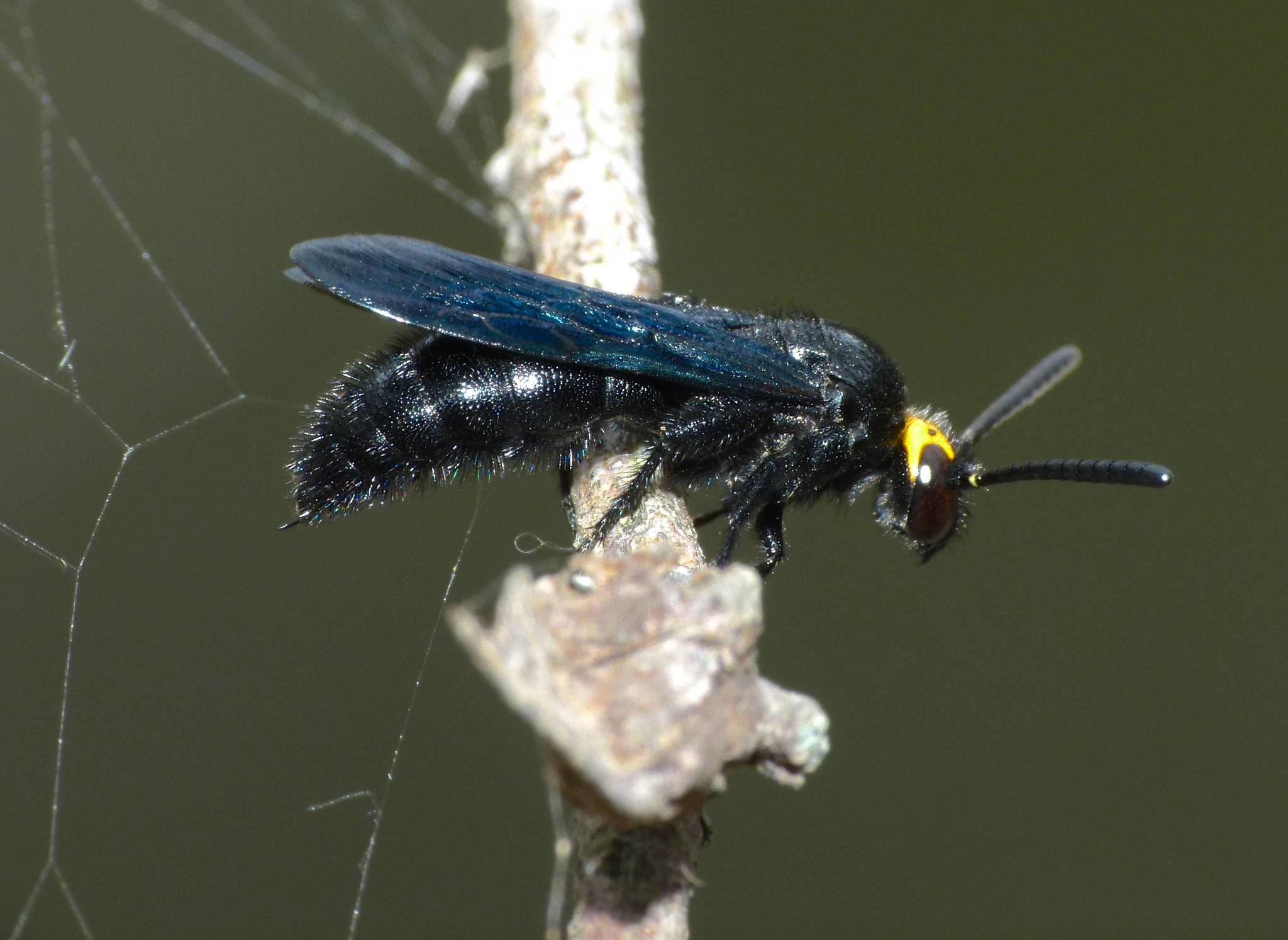
S. verticalis in Australia.

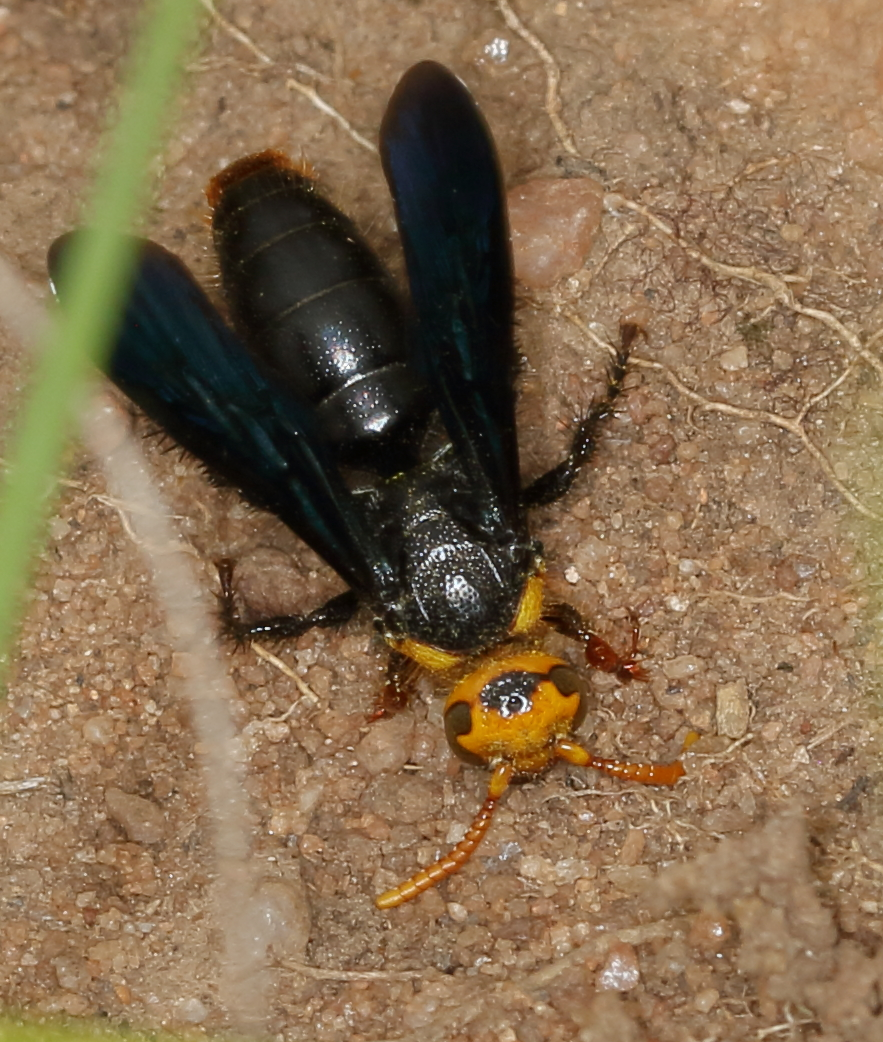
S. wahlbergii in South Africa.
