= Megachile geneana =

Scientific classification
- Domain: Eukaryota
- Kingdom: Animalia
- Phylum: Arthropoda
- Class: Insecta
- Order: Hymenoptera
- Family: Megachilidae
- Genus: Megachile
- Species: M. geneana

Binomial name
- Megachile geneana (Gribodo, 1894)

Species of leafcutter bee (Megachile)

Megachile geneana is a species of bee in the family Megachilidae. It was described by Giovanni Gribodo in 1894.
