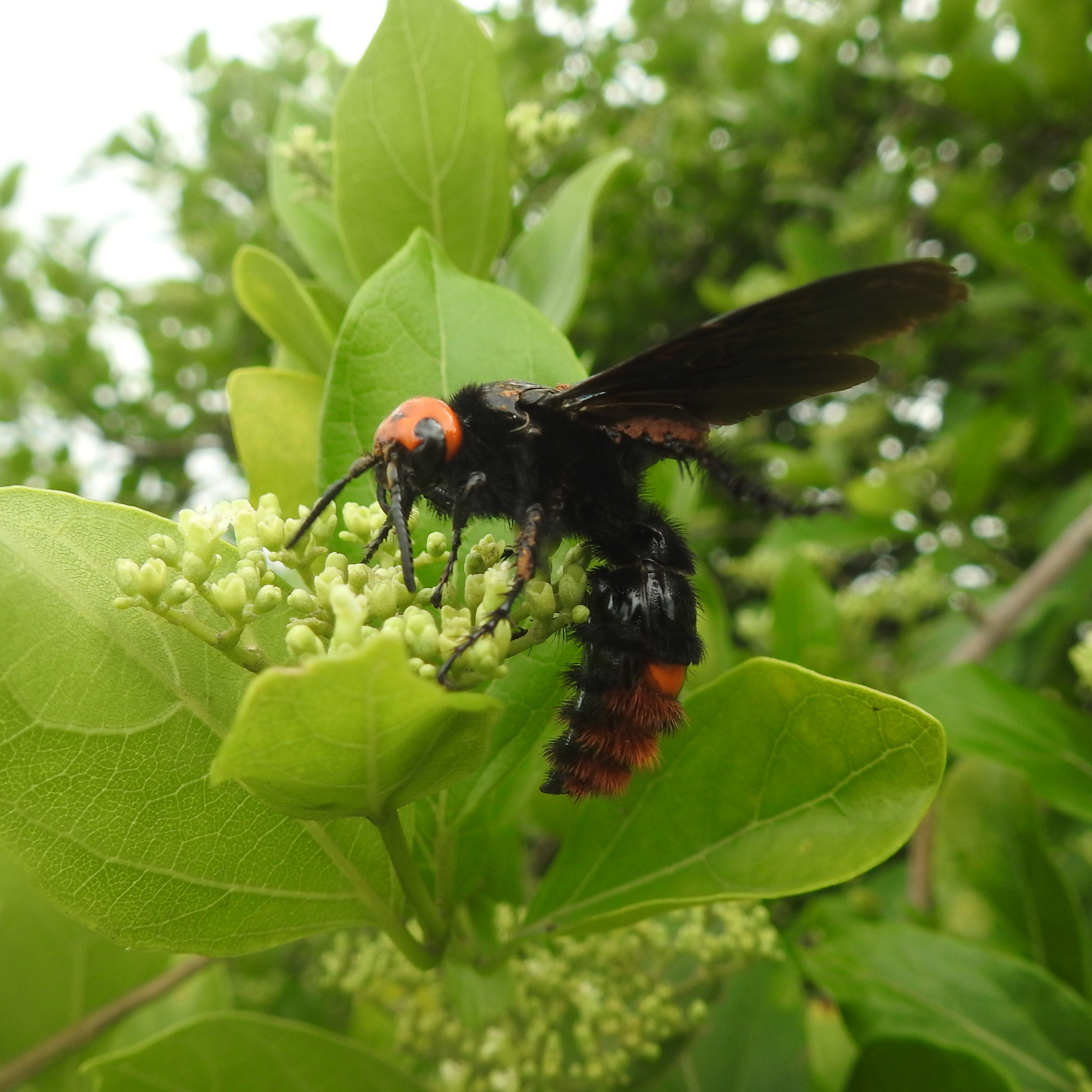
- Regicolia azurea hindostana from Kerala, India

Scientific classification
- Kingdom: Animalia
- Phylum: Arthropoda
- Clade: Pancrustacea
- Class: Insecta
- Order: Hymenoptera
- Family: Scoliidae
- Genus: Regiscolia
- Species: R. azurea

Binomial name
- Regiscolia azurea (Christ, 1791)

Synonyms
- Megascolia azurea (Christ, 1791)

= Regiscolia azurea =

Species of wasp

Regicolia azurea is a species of scoliid wasp found in parts of tropical Asia. These are among the largest wasps and several subspecies have been described. Their larvae are parasitoids mainly of scarabeoid larvae.

== Subspecies ==
There are 6 subspecies of Regicolia azurea:

- Regicolia azurea azurea (Christ, 1791)
- Regicolia azurea christiana (Betrem & Guiglia, 1958)
- Regicolia azurea cochinensis (Betrem, 1928)
- Regicolia azurea hindostana (Micha, 1927)
- Regicolia azurea michaae (Betrem, 1928)
- Regicolia azurea siamensis (Betrem, 1928)

== Gallery ==
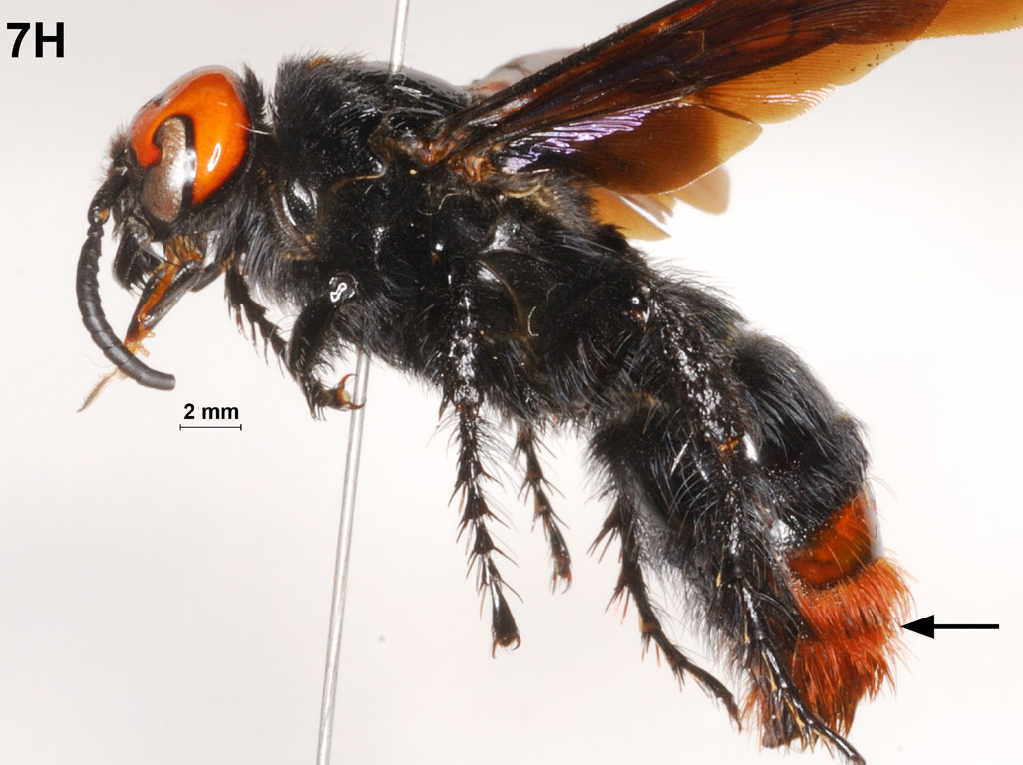
Regicolia azurea azurea collected in Hong Kong

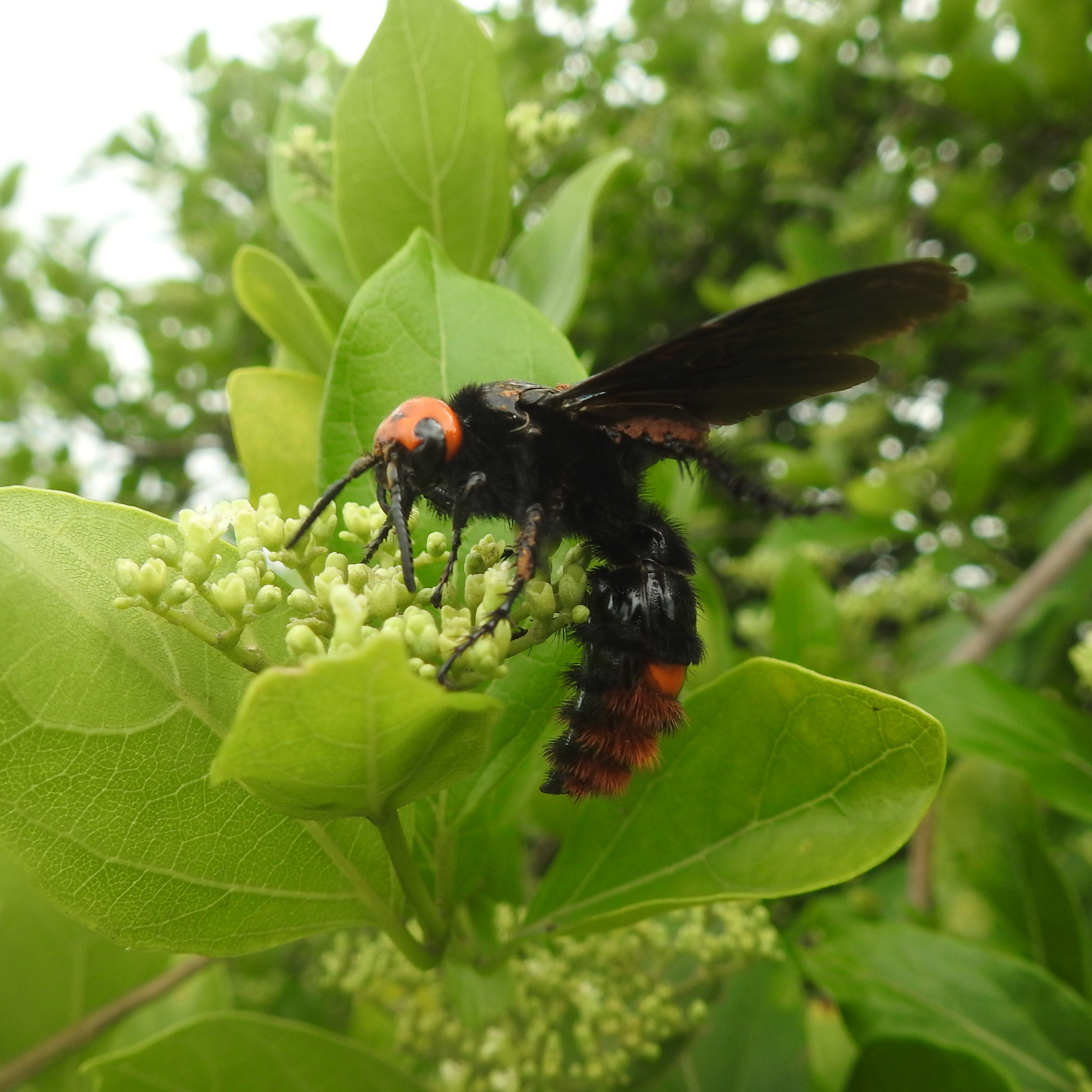
Regicolia azurea hindostana from Kerala, India

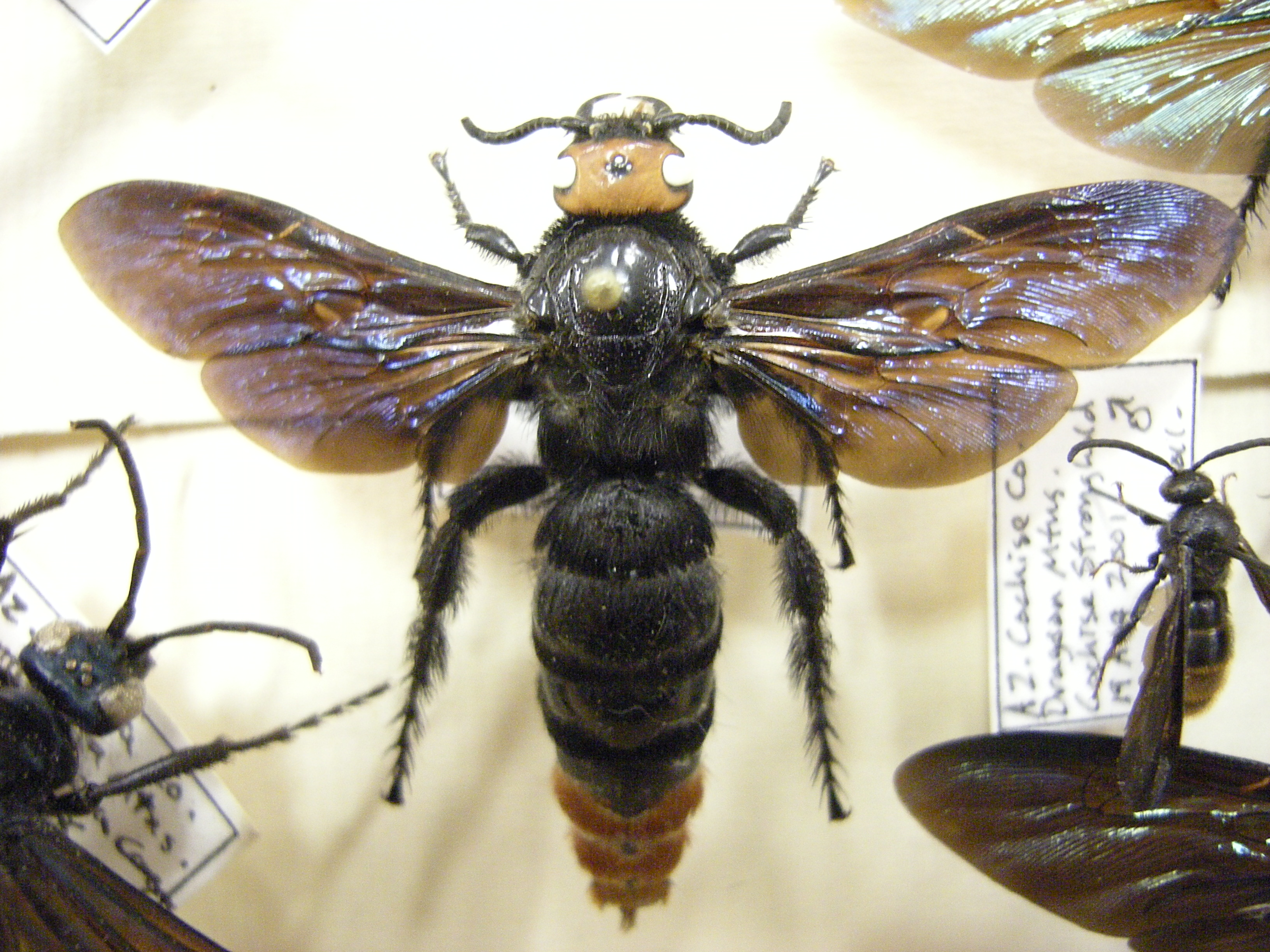
Regicolia azurea christiana preserved specimen
