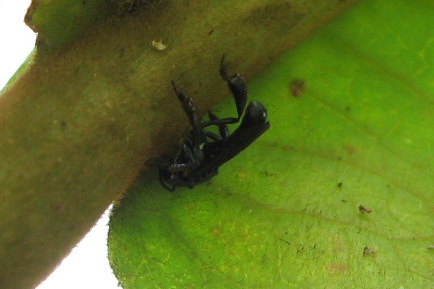

Scientific classification
- Kingdom: Animalia
- Phylum: Arthropoda
- Class: Insecta
- Order: Hymenoptera
- Family: Apidae
- Tribe: Meliponini
- Genus: Dactylurina
- Species: D. staudingeri

Binomial name
- Dactylurina staudingeri (Gribodo, 1893)

= Dactylurina staudingeri =

Species of insect

Dactylurina staudingeri, also known by its common name West African slender-stingless bee, is a species of insect in the genus Dactylurina, first described in 1893 by Giovanni Gribodo.
