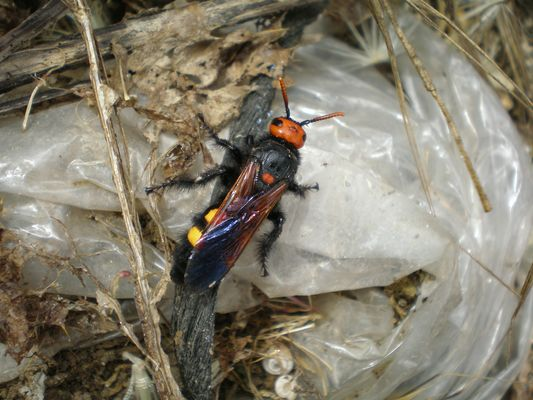
- Regiscolia bidens

Scientific classification
- Kingdom: Animalia
- Phylum: Arthropoda
- Clade: Pancrustacea
- Class: Insecta
- Order: Hymenoptera
- Family: Scoliidae
- Subfamily: Scoliinae
- Tribe: Scoliini
- Genus: Regiscolia; Betrem & Bradley, 1964

Type species
- Scolia flavifrons Fabricius, 1775

Species
- 9 species, see text

= Regiscolia =

Genus of wasps

Regiscolia is a genus of solitary wasps from the family Scoliidae.

== Taxonomy and phylogeny ==
Regiscolia was originally described in 1964 by Betrem and Bradley. It was elevated to a separate genus in 2025 by Castagnet and Cabon.

== Species ==
The following 9 species are classified in the genus Regiscolia:

- Regiscolia alecto (Smith, 1858)
- Regiscolia almoraensis (Gupta & Jonathan, 2003)
- Regicolia azurea (Christ, 1791)
- Regiscolia bidens (Linnaeus, 1767)
- Regiscolia capitata (Fabricius, 1804)
- Regiscolia fulvifrons (Saussure, 1854)
- Regiscolia maculata (Drury, 1773)
- Regiscolia rubida (Gribodo, 1893)
- Regiscolia splendida (Saussure, 1858)
