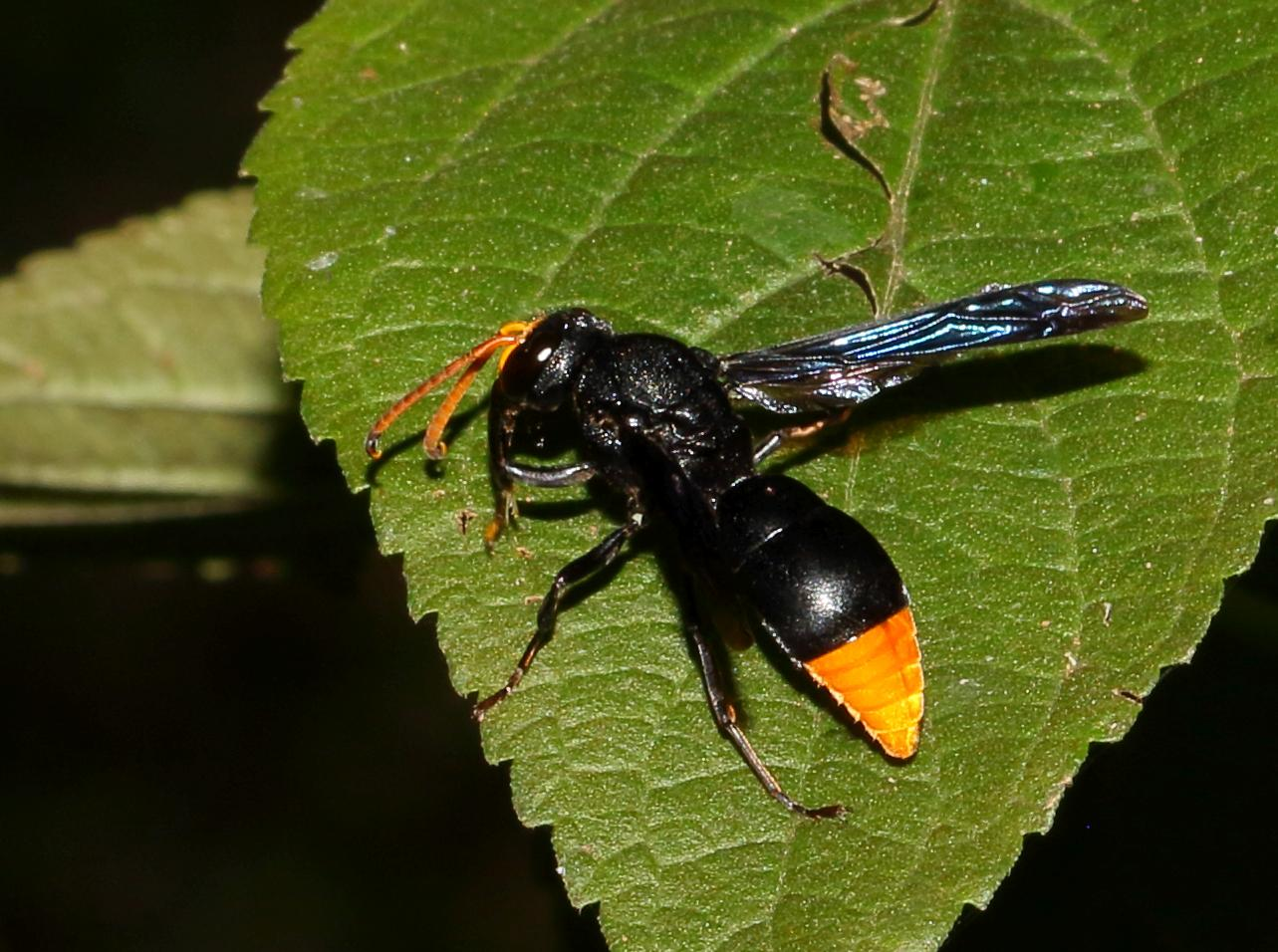
- Male Synagris sp.

Scientific classification
- Kingdom: Animalia
- Phylum: Arthropoda
- Class: Insecta
- Order: Hymenoptera
- Family: Vespidae
- Subfamily: Eumeninae
- Genus: Synagris; Latreille, 1802

Type species
- Synagris cornuta (Linnaeus, 1758)

= Synagris =

Genus of wasps

Synagris is an Afrotropical genus of large potter wasps. Several Synagris wasps are strongly sexually dimorphic and males bear notable morphological secondary sexual traits including metasomal lamellar or angular protruding structures and hornlike or tusklike mandibular and/or clypeal projections.

The few species of Synagris with known biology are also notable for guarding their nests and even attending and feeding their larvae during their development (progressive provisioning), a primitively social behavior unusual among eumenines, which normally practice mass provisioning.

There are 3 subgenera and 24 species currently recognized, with many species formerly in the genus now removed to the genera Pseudagris and Rhynchagris.

== Species ==
Subgenus Hypagris de Saussure, 1855

- Synagris abyssinica Guerin, 1848
- Synagris aestuans (Fabricius, 1781)
- Synagris analis Saussure, 1856
- Synagris biplagiata Gusenleitner, 2005
- Synagris calida (Linnaeus, 1758)
- Synagris crassipes Kohl, 1894
- Synagris elephas Andre, 1895
- Synagris fasciata Mocsary, 1903
- Synagris kohli Maidl, 1914
- Synagris maxillosa Saussure, 1863
- Synagris mirabilis Guerin, 1848
- Synagris negusi Buysson, 1906
- Synagris rubescens Giordani Soika, 1989
- Synagris spiniventris (Illiger, 1802)
- Synagris spinosuscula Saussure, 1852
- Synagris stridens Giordani Soika, 1987

Subgenus Paragris de Saussure, 1855

- Synagris huberti de Saussure, 1855
- Synagris ornatissima Maidl, 1914
- Synagris rufopicta Tullgren, 1904

Subgenus Synagris Latreille, 1802

- Synagris cornuta (Linnaeus, 1758)
- Synagris fulva Mocsary, 1903
- Synagris proserpina Gribodo, 1891
- Synagris similis Maidl, 1914
