= Afrepipona macrocephala =

Scientific classification
- Domain: Eukaryota
- Kingdom: Animalia
- Phylum: Arthropoda
- Class: Insecta
- Order: Hymenoptera
- Family: Vespidae
- Genus: Afrepipona
- Species: A. macrocephala

Binomial name
- Afrepipona macrocephala (Grobodo, 1894)

Species of wasp

Afrepipona macrocephala is a species of wasp in the family Vespidae. It was described by Gribodo in 1894.
