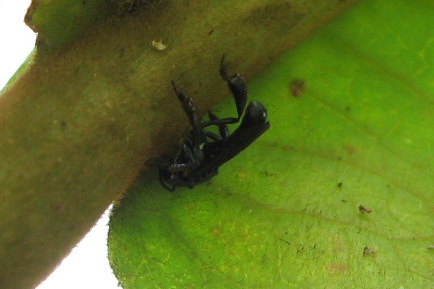
- Dactylurina staudingeri

Scientific classification
- Domain: Eukaryota
- Kingdom: Animalia
- Phylum: Arthropoda
- Class: Insecta
- Order: Hymenoptera
- Family: Apidae
- Tribe: Meliponini
- Genus: Dactylurina; Cockerell, 1934

Species
- Dactylurina schmidti (Stadelmann, 1895); Dactylurina staudingeri (Gribodo, 1893)

= Dactylurina =

Genus of insect

Dactylurina is a genus of bees first described in 1934.
