= Pseudagris =

Scientific classification
- Kingdom: Animalia
- Phylum: Arthropoda
- Class: Insecta
- Order: Hymenoptera
- Family: Vespidae
- Subfamily: Eumeninae
- Genus: Pseudagris de Saussure, 1863

Genus of wasps

Pseudagris is an Afrotropical genus of large potter wasps, formerly treated as a subgenus within Synagris.

== Species ==
- Pseudagris albicauda (von Schulthess, 1923)
- Pseudagris apicalis Selis, 2023
- Pseudagris brunnea Gusenleitner, 2007
- Pseudagris carinata (de Saussure, 1863)
- Pseudagris holomelas holomelas (André, 1895)
- Pseudagris holomelas rubripes (Giordani Soika, 1987)
- Pseudagris nigrithorax Selis, 2023
- Pseudagris nigrorufa Selis, 2023
- Pseudagris pygmaea Gusenleitner, 1998
- Pseudagris tanzanica Selis, 2023
- Pseudagris tessmanniana (von Schulthess, 1913)
- Pseudagris versicolor (von Schulthess, 1914)
