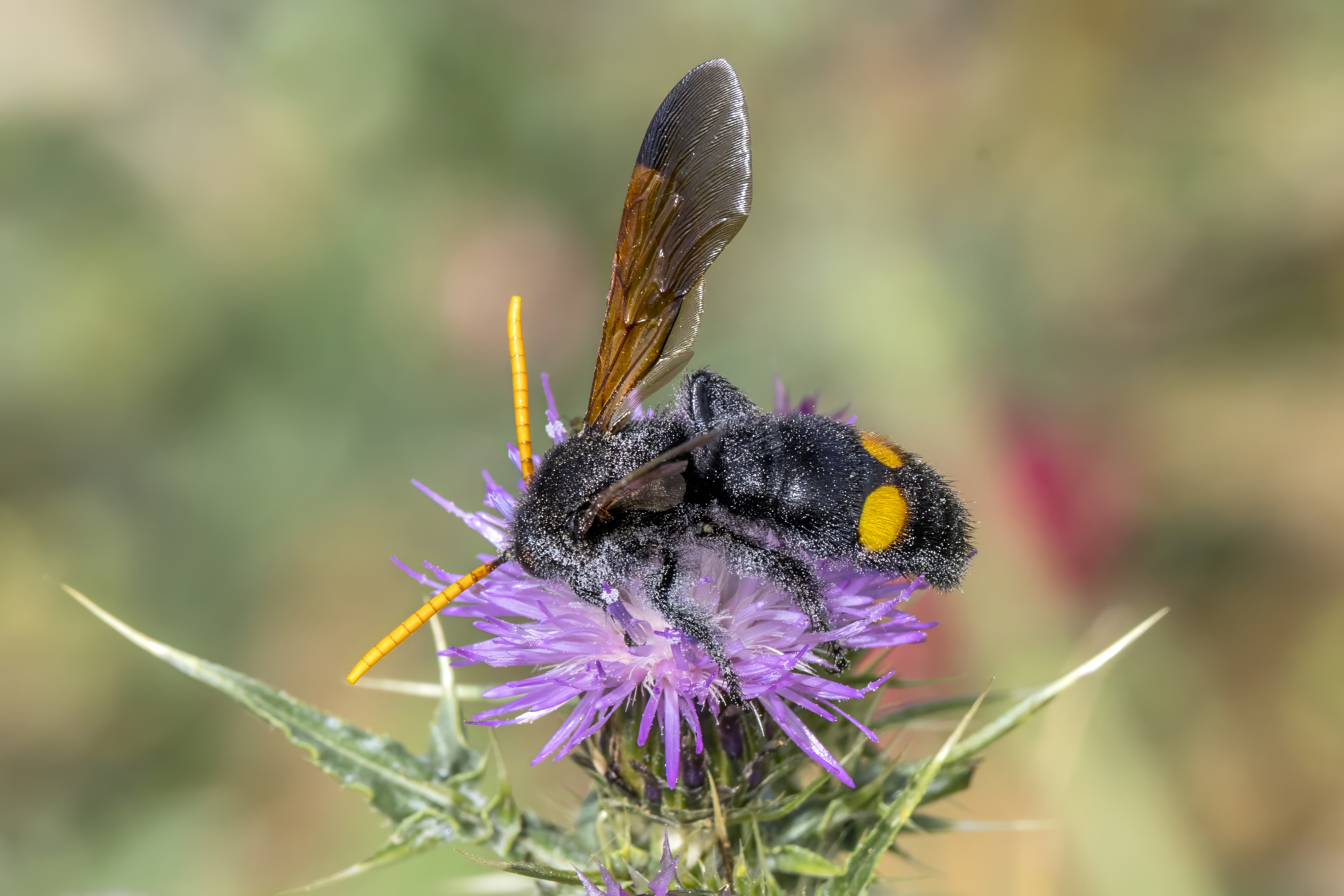
- Regiscolia bidens, Tunisia

Scientific classification
- Kingdom: Animalia
- Phylum: Arthropoda
- Clade: Pancrustacea
- Class: Insecta
- Order: Hymenoptera
- Family: Scoliidae
- Subfamily: Scoliinae
- Tribe: Scoliini; Latreille, 1802

= Scoliini =

Tribe of wasps

Scoliini is a cosmopolitan tribe of the family Scoliidae.

== Genera ==
Genera within this tribe include:

- Austroscolia Betrem, 1927
- Diliacos Saussure & Sichel, 1864
- Gigascolia Castagnet & Cabon, 2025
- Laeviscolia Betrem, 1928
- Liacos Guérin-Méneville, 1838
- Megascolia Betrem, 1928
- Microscolia Betrem, 1928
- Mutilloscolia Bradley, 1959
- Pyrrhoscolia Bradley, 1957
- Regiscolia Betrem & Bradley, 1964
- Scolia Fabricius 1775
- Triscolia de Saussure 1863
