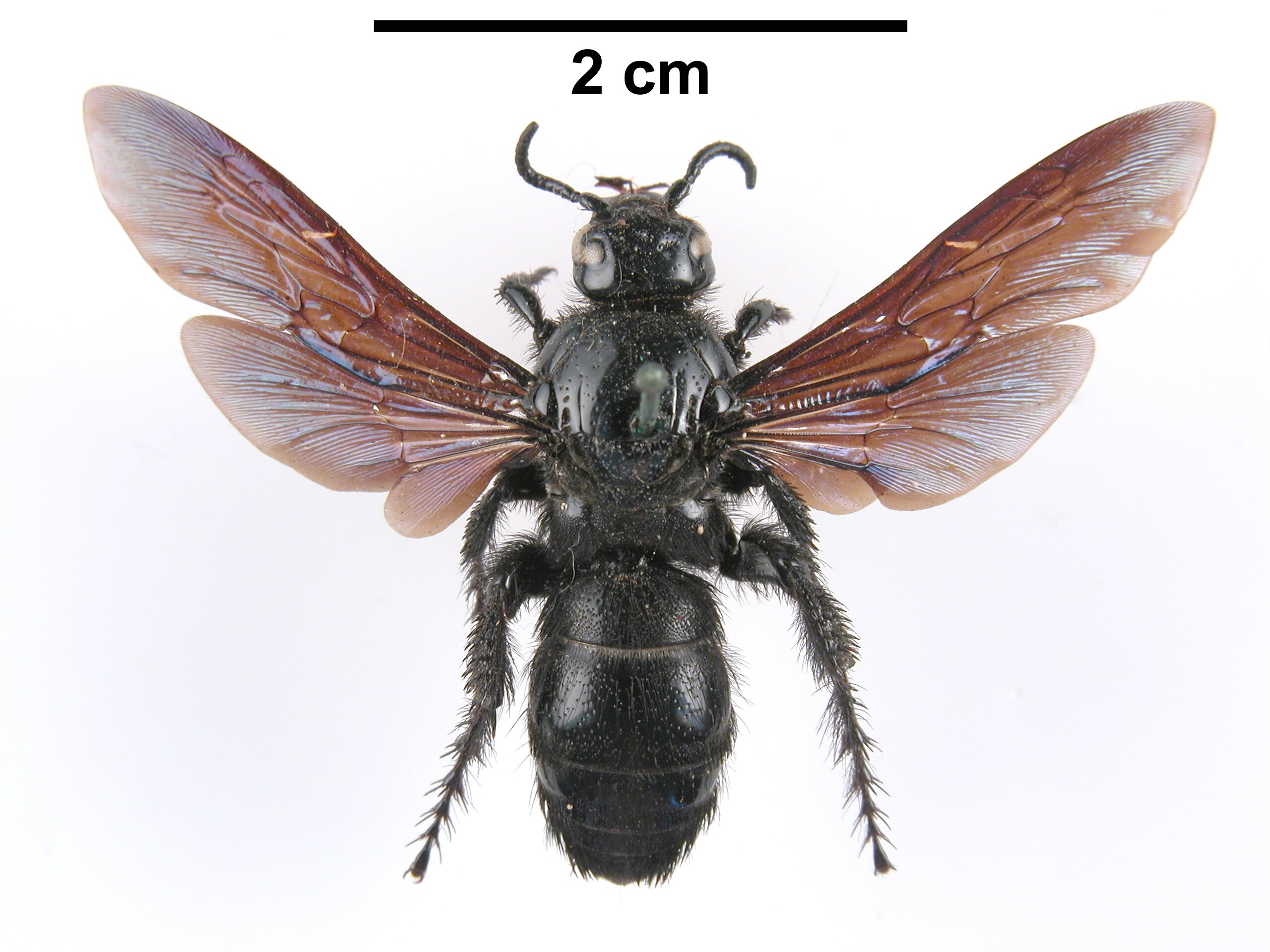
- A. soror female

Scientific classification
- Kingdom: Animalia
- Phylum: Arthropoda
- Clade: Pancrustacea
- Class: Insecta
- Order: Hymenoptera
- Family: Scoliidae
- Genus: Austroscolia
- Species: A. soror

Binomial name
- Austroscolia soror (Smith, 1855)

Synonyms
- Scolia viridipennis Smith, 1855; Discolia soror (Smith, 1855); Scolia soror Smith, 1855; Scolia cyanipennis Lepeletier, 1845

= Austroscolia soror =

Species of wasp

Austroscolia soror is a species of scoliid wasp and a common insect found in eastern Australia. This is one of several Australian species collectively referred to as a blue flower wasp, black flower wasp, or blue hairy flower wasp.

== Distribution ==
A. soror occurs in coastal areas from Queensland south to Victoria.

== Description and identification ==
A. soror is a very large scoliid wasp reaching up to 3 cm long. The body is black, and the wings are smoky with a blue iridescence. This colour scheme is shared by several other Australian scoliids. The setae of A. soror are entirely black, and the second sternite is non-tuberculate. As the punctation on the pronotum, mesothorax, and gaster is sparse, these parts appear shining rather than matte. As a member of Austroscolia, the wings have a single recurrent vein and three submarginal cells.

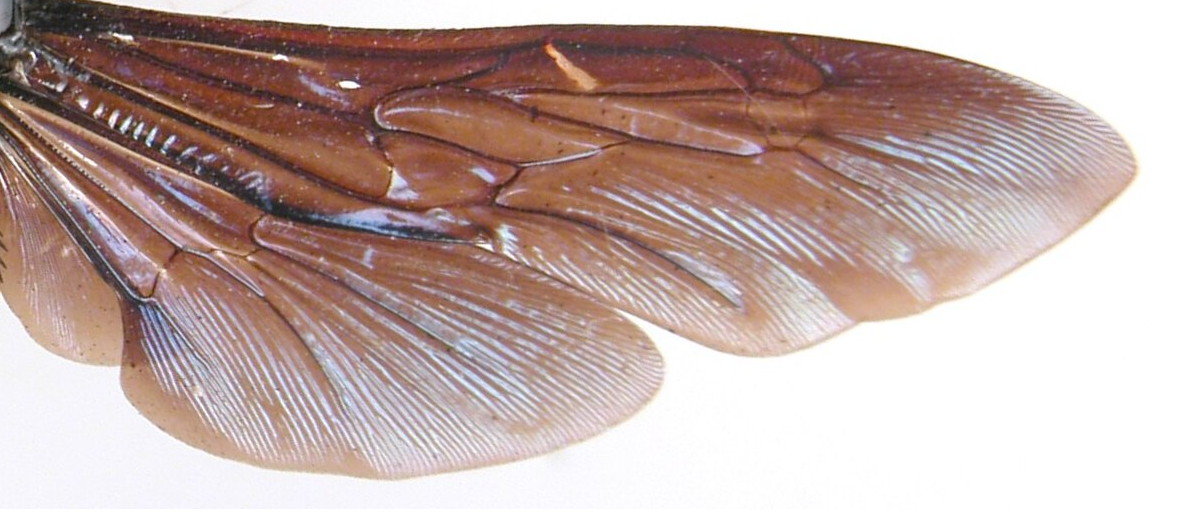
A. soror wing venation

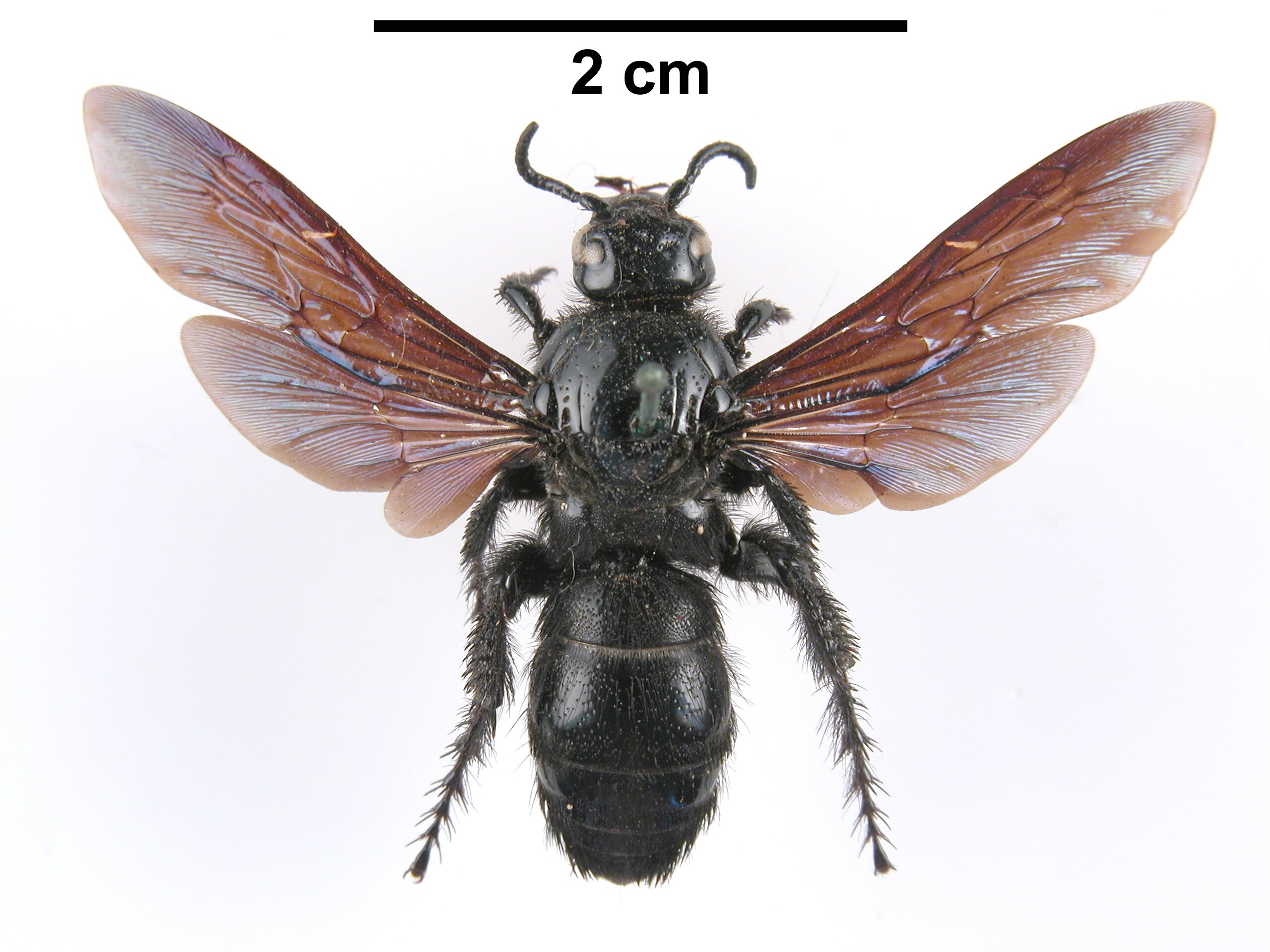
Female A. soror specimen

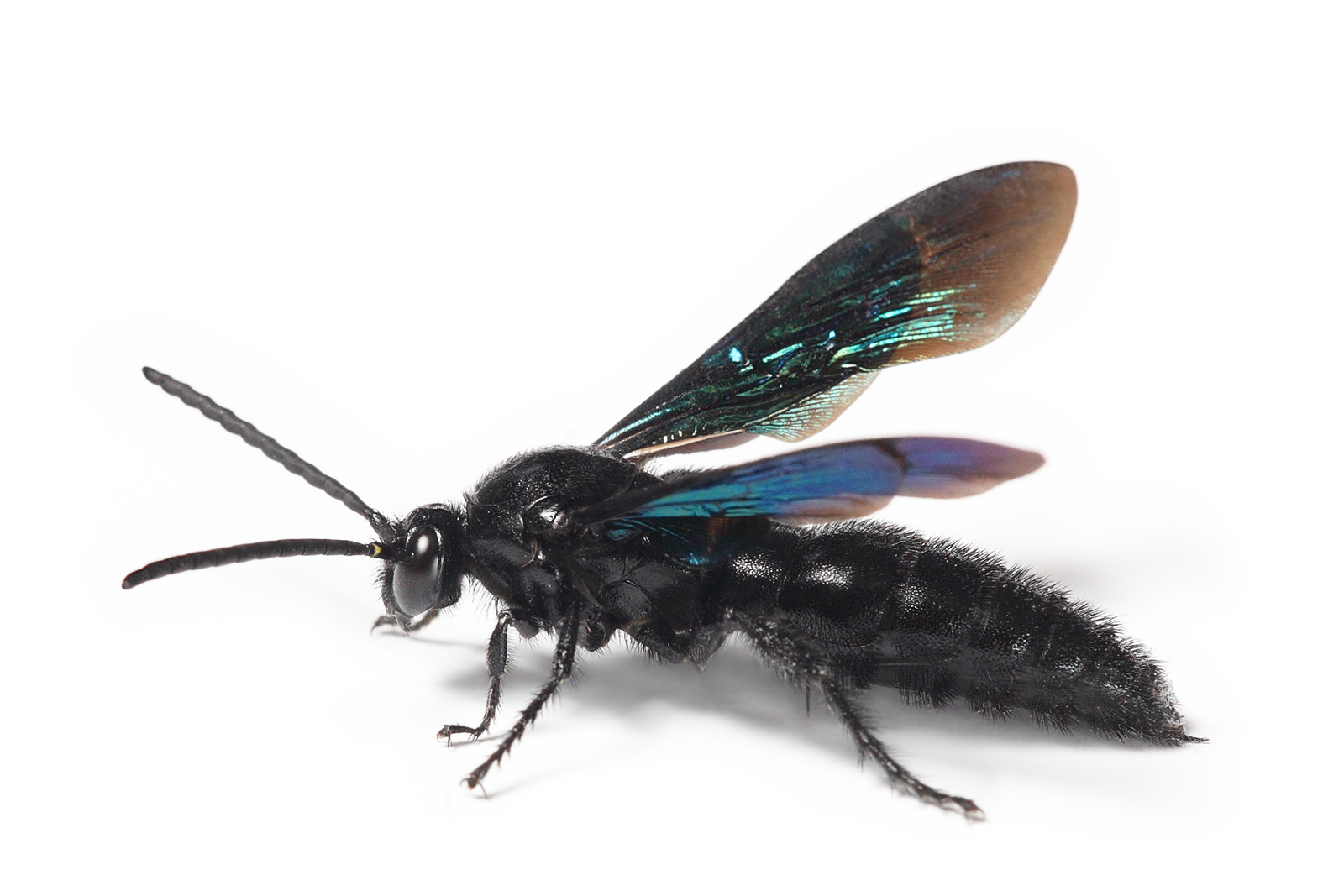
Male A. soror in Victoria

Distinguishing this species requires close and thorough inspection of specimens. The allied and mostly sympatric A. nitida varifrons has denser punctures on the pronotum, mesothorax, and gaster and thus a more matte appearance. Its wings often have greener reflections. A. commixta of the Northern Territory, known only from the male, has a tuberculate second sternite and has shorter antennae. Its thorax is sparsely punctured and shining like A. soror while its abdomen is more densely punctured like A. nitida varifrons. Another common species, Australelis anthracina, has two recurrent veins and white setae. While most females and southwestern males of that species are entirely black, males in the east have a single pair of yellow to orange spots on the third segment of the gaster.

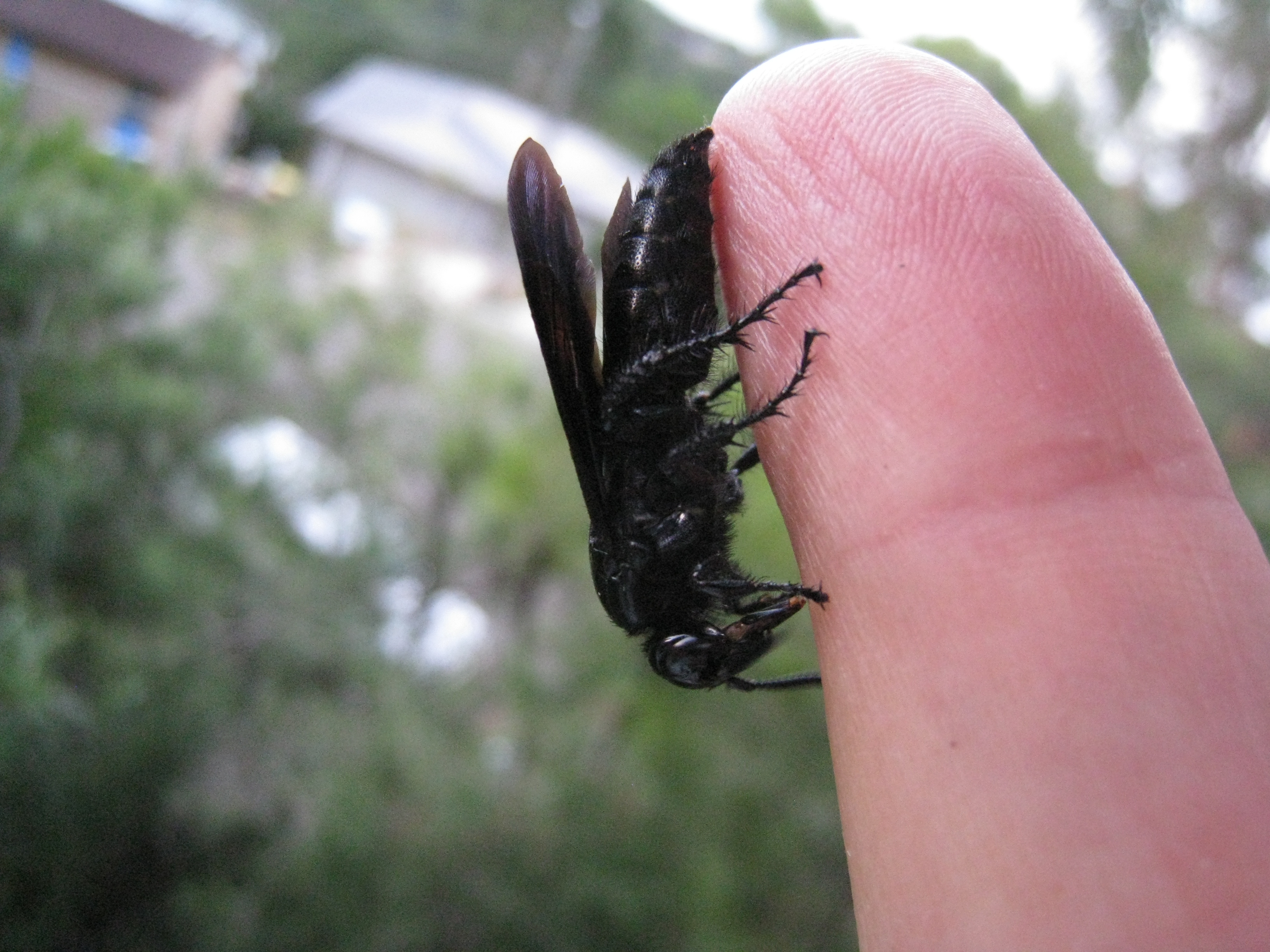
Female of the similar Austroscolia nitida varifrons photographed in New South Wales, Australia.

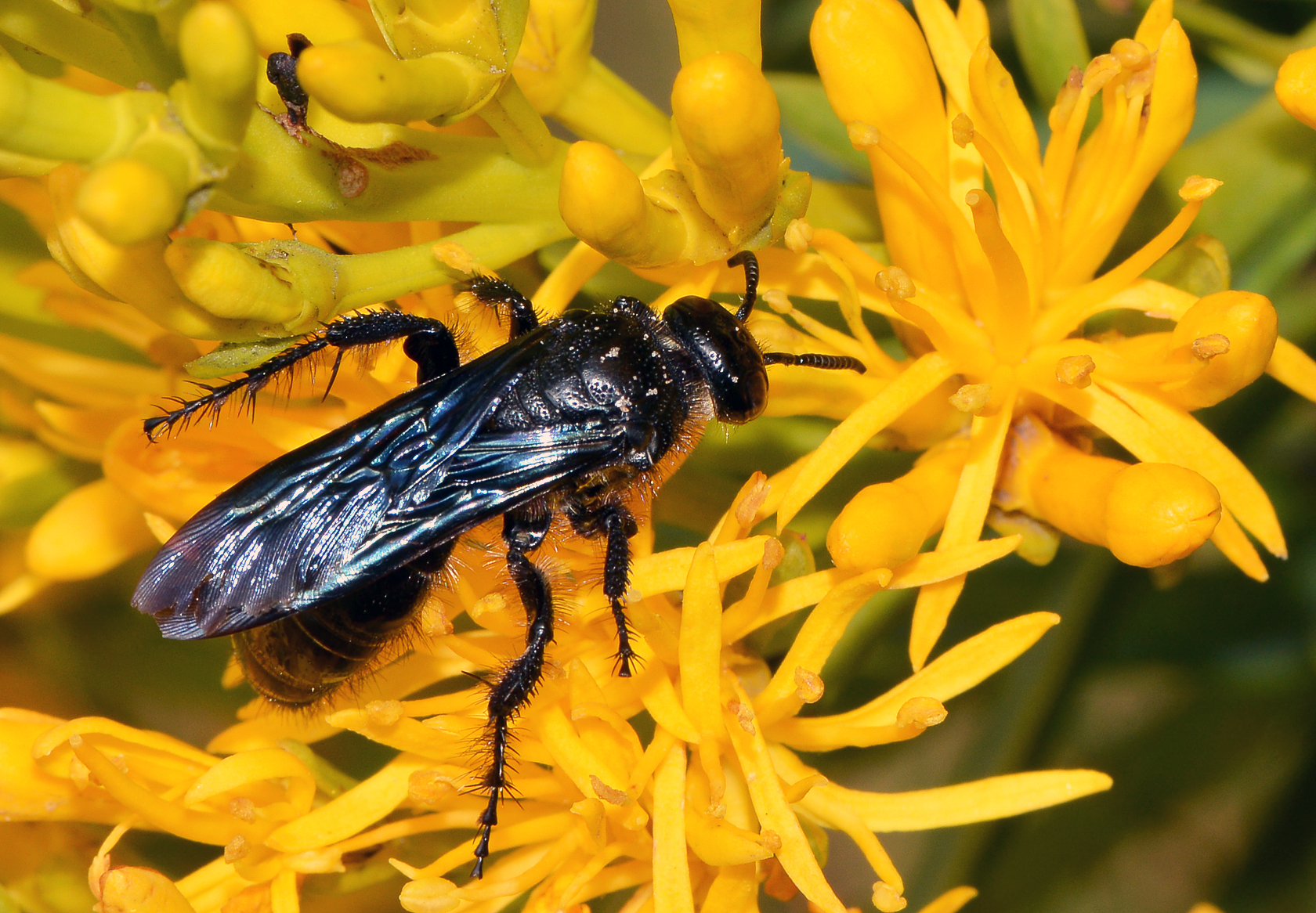
Female of the similar Australelis anthracina in Western Australia

== Biology ==
Adults feed on nectar. The female lays her eggs on beetle larvae.
