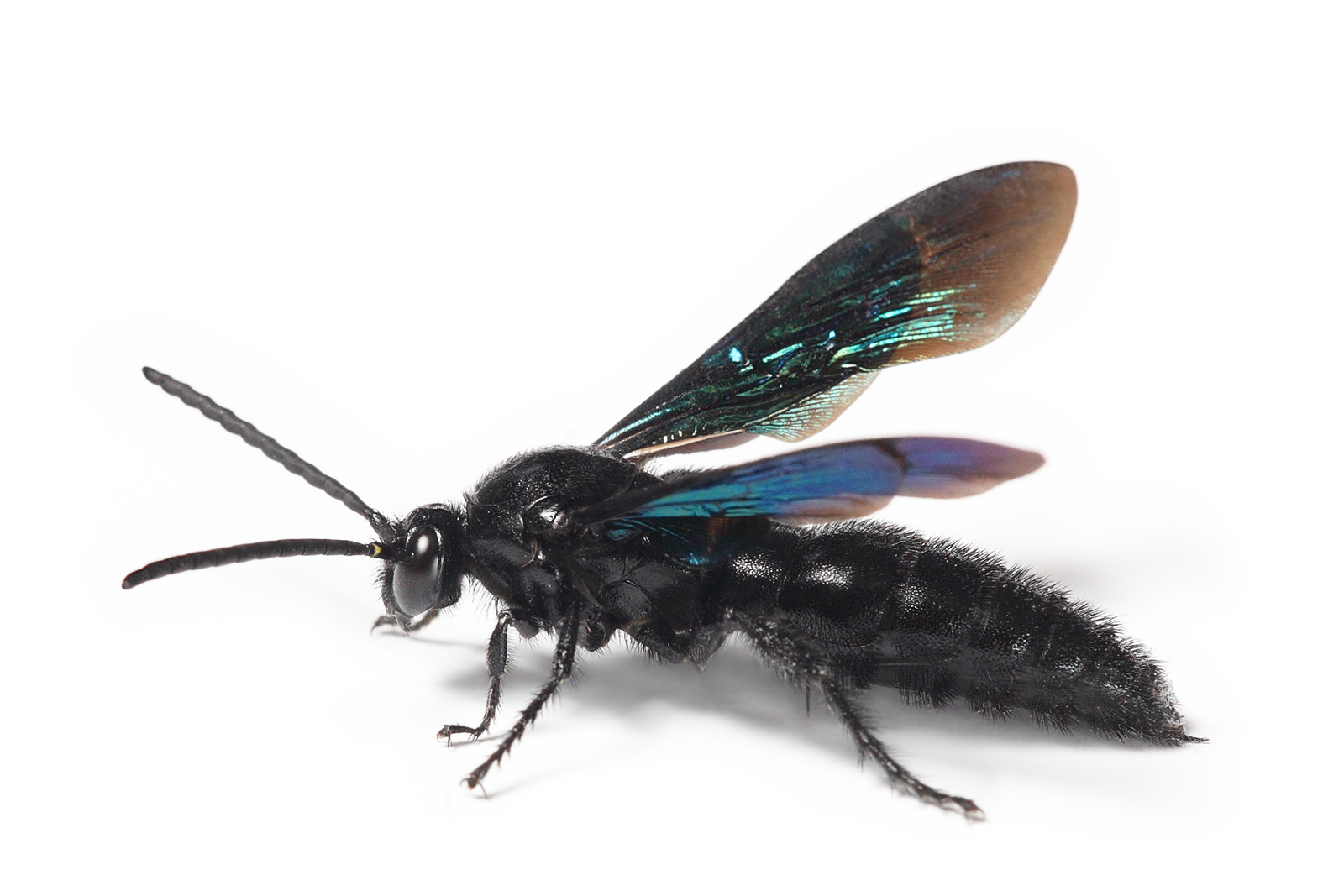
- Austroscolia soror photographed in Melbourne, Australia

Scientific classification
- Kingdom: Animalia
- Phylum: Arthropoda
- Clade: Pancrustacea
- Class: Insecta
- Order: Hymenoptera
- Family: Scoliidae
- Tribe: Scoliini
- Genus: Austroscolia; Betrem, 1927

Type species
- Austroscolia ruficeps (Smith, 1855)

= Austroscolia =

Genus of wasps

Austroscolia Indian variant with orange tipped Antenna clicked in Tirumangalam, Madurai, India

Austroscolia is a genus of wasps belonging to the family Scoliidae, subfamily Scoliinae. It was formerly classified as a subgenus of Scolia.

== Species ==
The following species are included in Austroscolia:

- Austroscolia betremianus Krombein, 1963
- Austroscolia bissauensis Bradley, 1959
- Austroscolia carnifex (Coquerel, 1855)
  - Austroscolia carnifex carnifex (Coquerel, 1855)
  - Austroscolia carnifex errans (Saussure, 1890)
- Austroscolia commixta (Turner, 1909)
- Austroscolia ebenina (Saussure, 1858)
  - Austroscolia ebenina ebenina (Saussure, 1858)
  - Austroscolia ebenina disparilis (Kirby, 1898)
- Austroscolia ignota Betrem, 1928
- Austroscolia loewitii (Dalla Torre, 1896)
- Austroscolia nitida (Smith, 1855)
  - Austroscolia nitida loewitii (Dalla Torre, 1897)
  - Austroscolia nitida nitida (Smith, 1855)
  - Austroscolia nitida punctatissima (Kirby, 1889)
  - Austroscolia nitida varifrons (Cameron, 1905)
  - Austroscolia nitida nitidella (Betrem, 1933)
- Austroscolia nitidella Betrem, 1933
- Austroscolia nudata (Smith, 1855)
- Austroscolia pulchripennis (Cameron, 1901)
  - Austroscolia pulchripennis pulchripennis (Cameron, 1901)
  - Austroscolia pulchripennis franclemonti Krombein, 1963
- Austroscolia ruficeps (Smith, 1855)
  - Austroscolia ruficeps costalis (Micha, 1927)
  - Austroscolia ruficeps cupreoviolacea (Micha, 1927)
  - Austroscolia ruficeps impressiformis (Micha, 1927)
  - Austroscolia ruficeps lombocensis Betrem, 1928
  - Austroscolia ruficeps nigropilosa (Micha, 1927)
  - Austroscolia ruficeps pagiensis Betrem, 1928
  - Austroscolia ruficeps roepkei Betrem, 1928
  - Austroscolia ruficeps ruficeps (Smith, 1855)
  - Austroscolia ruficeps tenggerana (Micha, 1927)
  - Austroscolia ruficeps viridianea (Micha, 1927)
- Austroscolia semitacta Bradley, 1959
- Austroscolia soror (Smith, 1855)
- Austroscolia toxopeusi (Betrem, 1928)

== Gallery ==
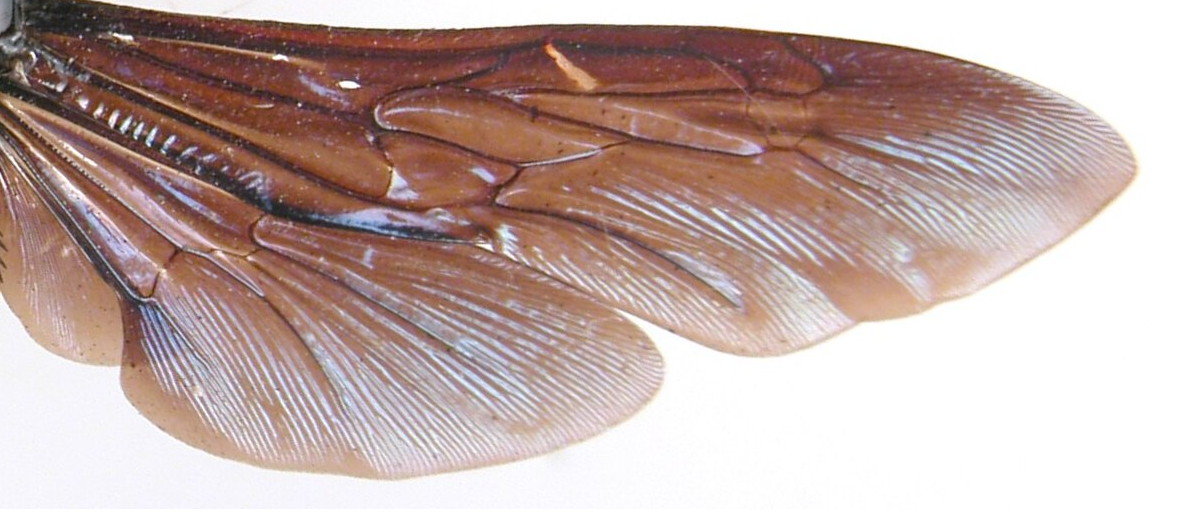
Austroscolia wing venation

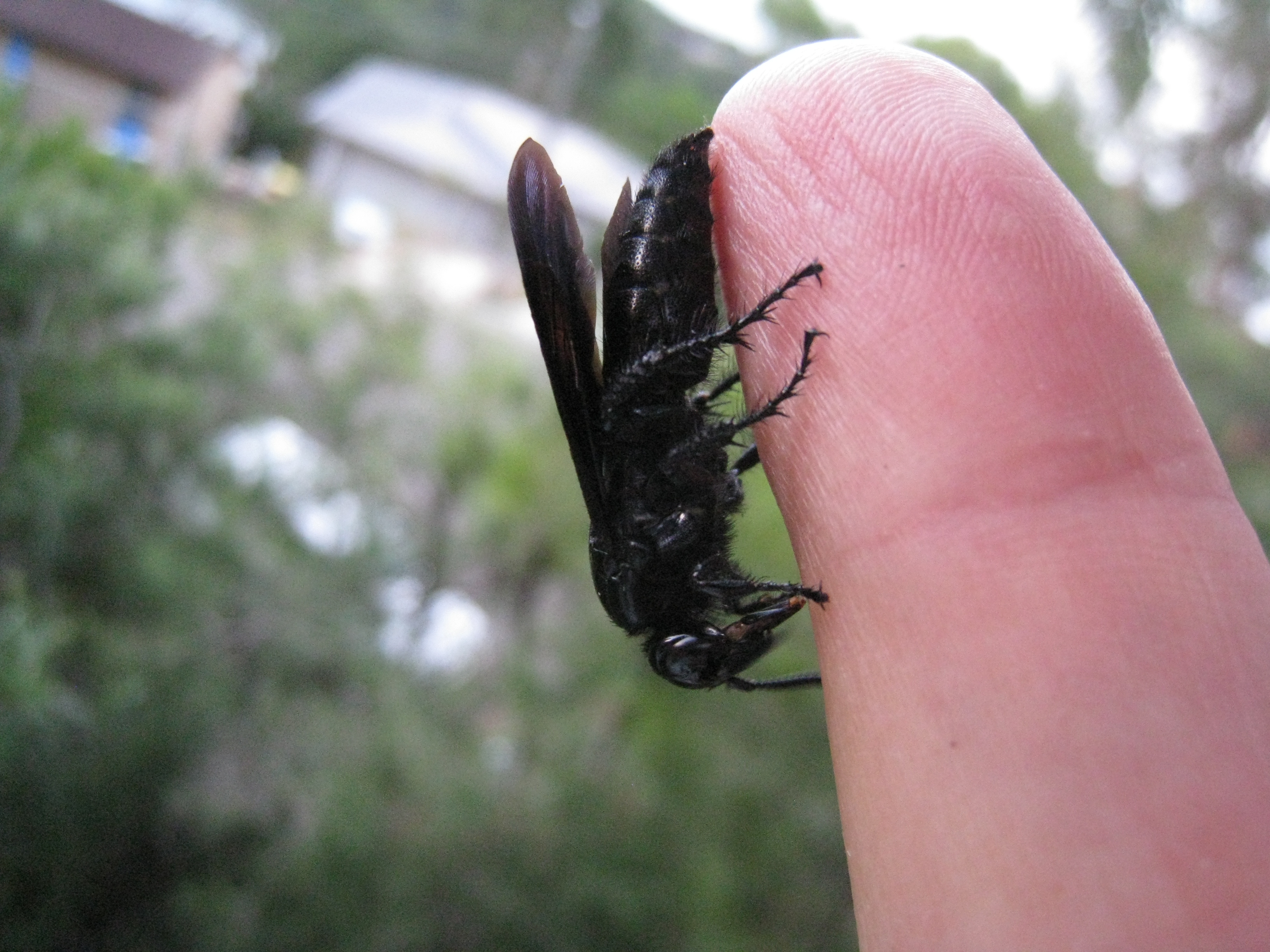
Austroscolia nitida varifrons photographed in New South Wales, Australia.

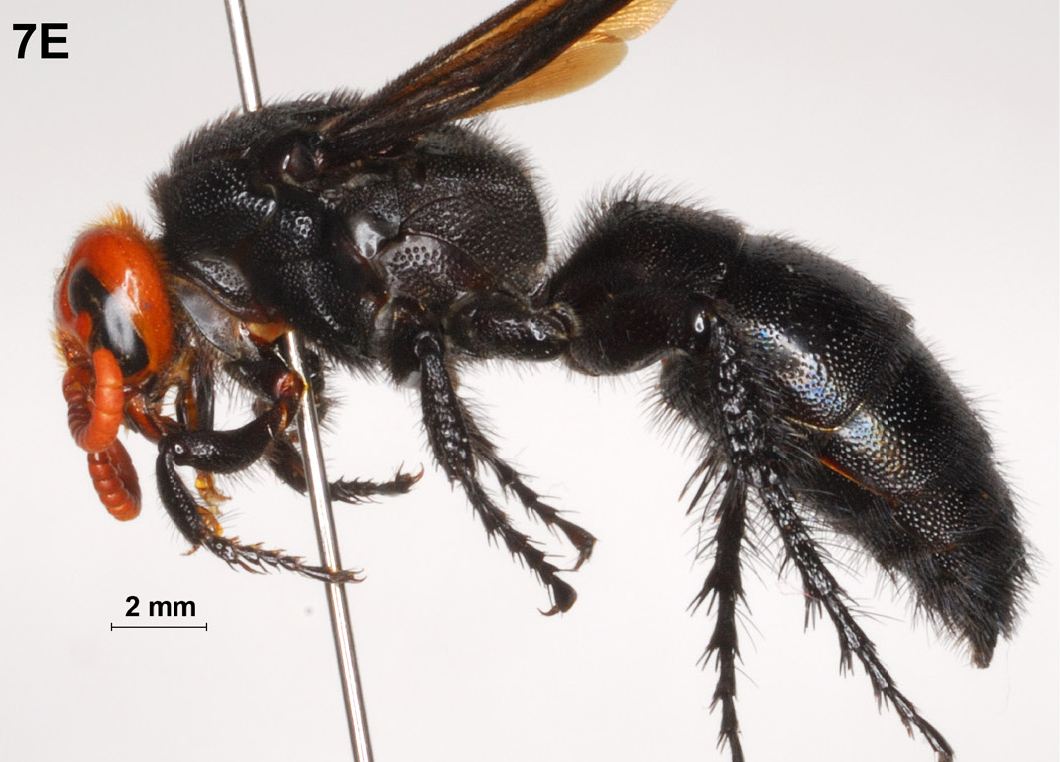
Austroscolia ruficeps ruficeps specimen fron Hong Kong

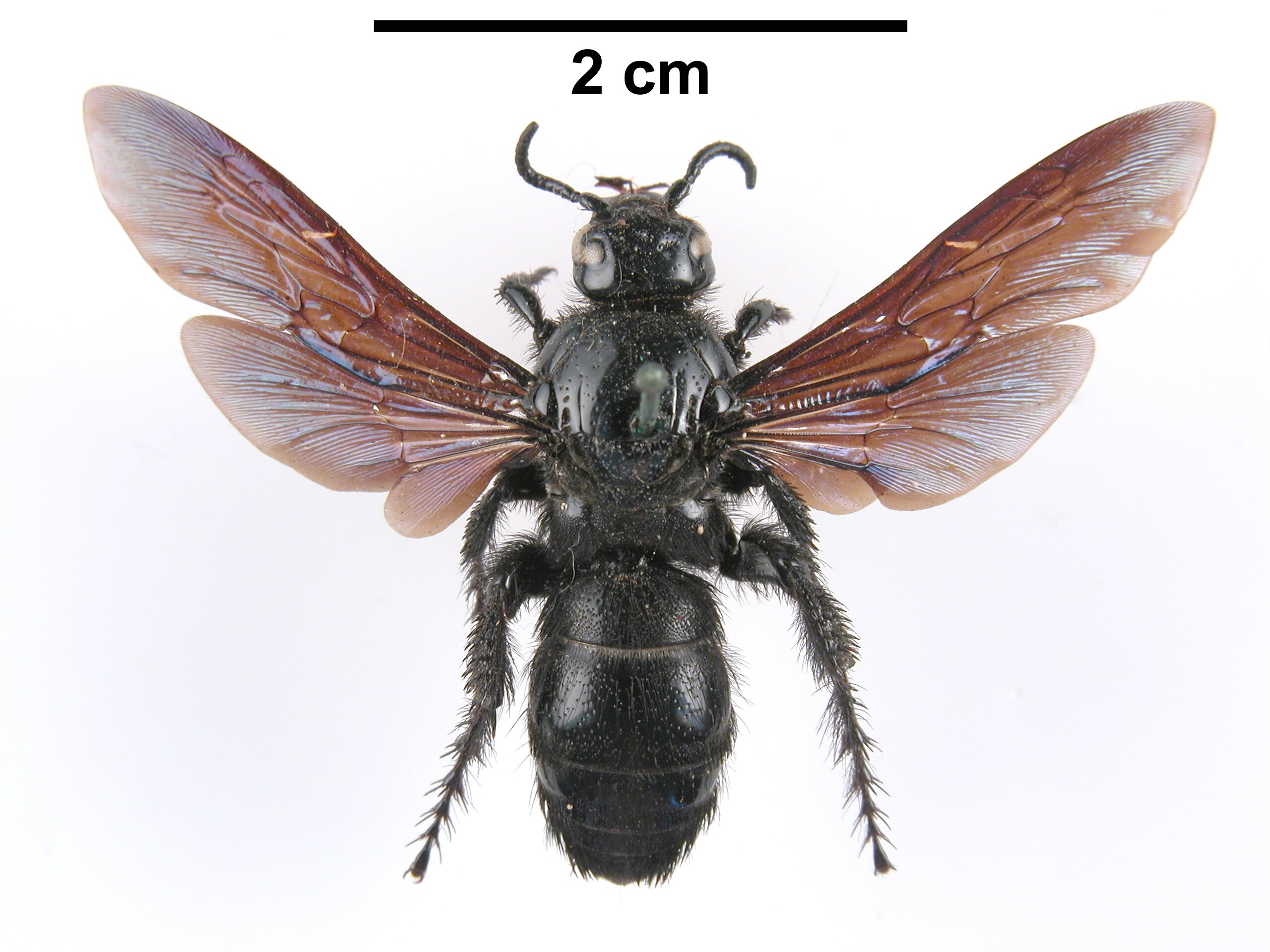
Austroscolia soror museum specimen
