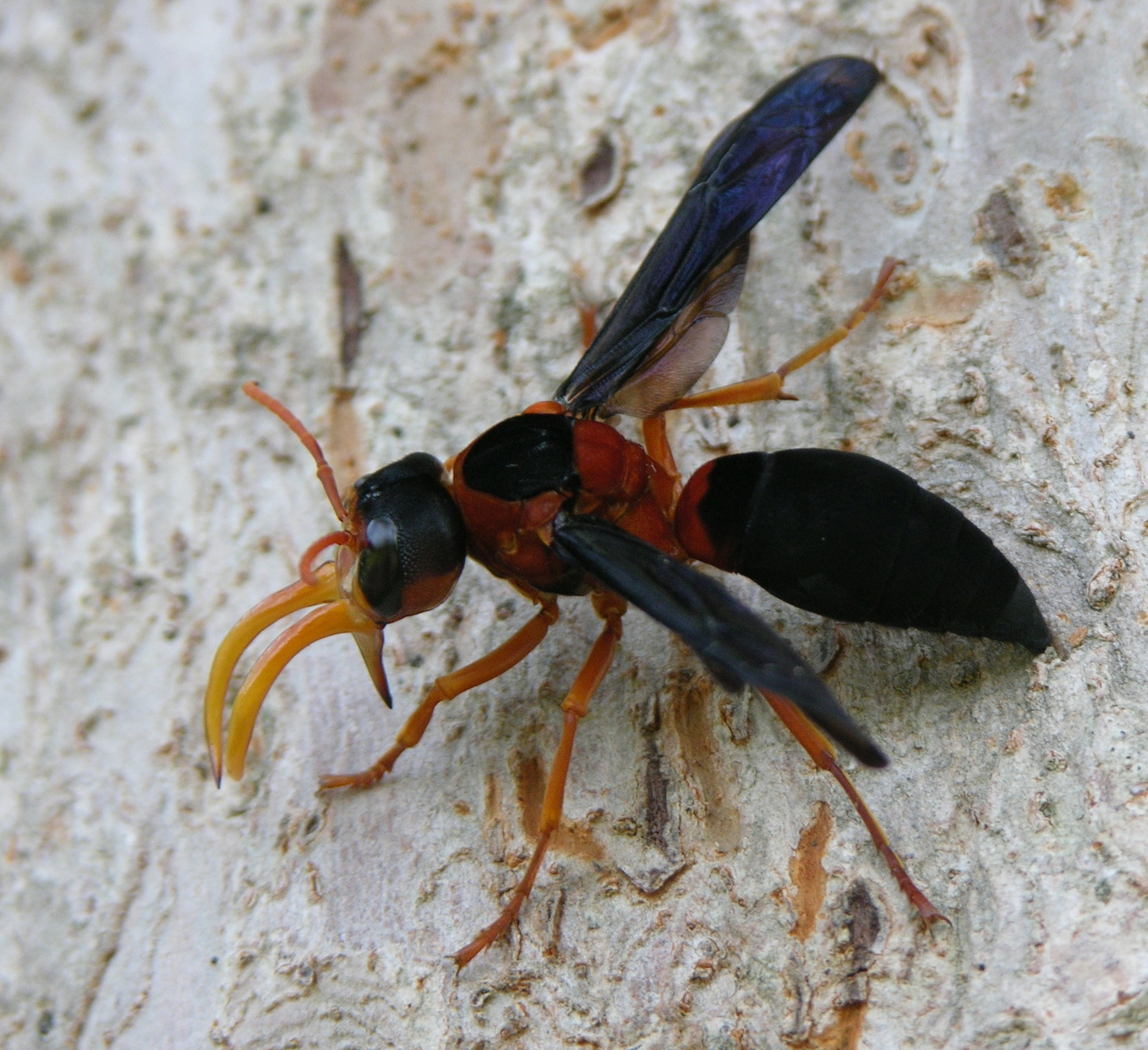
- Male

Scientific classification
- Kingdom: Animalia
- Phylum: Arthropoda
- Clade: Pancrustacea
- Class: Insecta
- Order: Hymenoptera
- Family: Vespidae
- Genus: Synagris
- Species: S. cornuta

Binomial name
- Synagris cornuta (Linnaeus, 1758)

= Synagris cornuta =

Species of wasp

Synagris cornuta is a species of potter wasp in the subfamily Eumeninae of the family Vespidae.

Unlike most aculeate Hymenoptera, males of S. cornuta are larger, on average, than females and most have long mandibular tusks. Nests are usually constructed on the undersides of large leaves using soil; they generally have up to three cells. Females feed larvae with macerated pieces of caterpillar. Males have been seen patrolling from nest to nest; some guard nests for several days, using their tusks to compete other males over mud nest cells containing females that are about to emerge.
