= Afrepipona =

Scientific classification
- Domain: Eukaryota
- Kingdom: Animalia
- Phylum: Arthropoda
- Class: Insecta
- Order: Hymenoptera
- Family: Vespidae
- Subfamily: Eumeninae
- Genus: Afrepipona; Giordani Soika, 1965

Type species
- Odynerus macrocephalus Gribodo, 1894

Genus of wasps

Afrepipona is an Afrotropical genus of potter wasps. A revision of the genus was published in 2024.

== Species ==
- Afrepipona angusta (de Saussure, 1863)
- Afrepipona anomala Selis & Carpenter, 2024
- Afrepipona cellularis Selis & Carpenter, 2024
- Afrepipona clonata Selis & Carpenter, 2024
- Afrepipona cuprea Selis & Carpenter, 2024
- Afrepipona lamellata Selis & Carpenter, 2024
- Afrepipona lamptoensis Giordani Soika, 1965
- Afrepipona lamptula Selis & Carpenter, 2024
- Afrepipona lobulata Selis & Carpenter, 2024
- Afrepipona macrocephala (Gribodo, 1894)
- Afrepipona meridionalis Selis & Carpenter, 2024
- Afrepipona occidentalis Selis & Carpenter, 2024
- Afrepipona orientalis Selis & Carpenter, 2024
- Afrepipona punctatissima Selis & Carpenter, 2024
- Afrepipona scabra Selis & Carpenter, 2024
- Afrepipona segregata Selis & Carpenter, 2024
- Afrepipona tertia Gusenleitner, 2011
- Afrepipona ulterior Selis & Carpenter, 2024
- Afrepipona vulcanica Selis & Carpenter, 2024
