= Rhynchagris =

Scientific classification
- Kingdom: Animalia
- Phylum: Arthropoda
- Class: Insecta
- Order: Hymenoptera
- Family: Vespidae
- Subfamily: Eumeninae
- Genus: Rhynchagris; Maidl, 1914

Synonyms
- Pteromenes Giordani Soika, 1961

Genus of wasps

Rhynchagris is an Afrotropical genus of large potter wasps, formerly treated as a subgenus within Synagris.

== Species ==
- Rhynchagris mediocarinata (Giordani Soika, 1944)
- Rhynchagris paradisiaca (Giordani Soika, 1941)
- Rhynchagris vicaria (Stadelmann, 1898)
- Rhynchagris zebra Gusenleitner, 2000
