= Afrepipona lamptoensis =

Scientific classification
- Domain: Eukaryota
- Kingdom: Animalia
- Phylum: Arthropoda
- Class: Insecta
- Order: Hymenoptera
- Family: Vespidae
- Genus: Afrepipona
- Species: A. lamptoensis

Binomial name
- Afrepipona lamptoensis Giordani Soika, 1965

Species of wasp

Afrepipona lamptoensis is a species of wasp in the family Vespidae. It was described by Giordani Soika in 1965.
