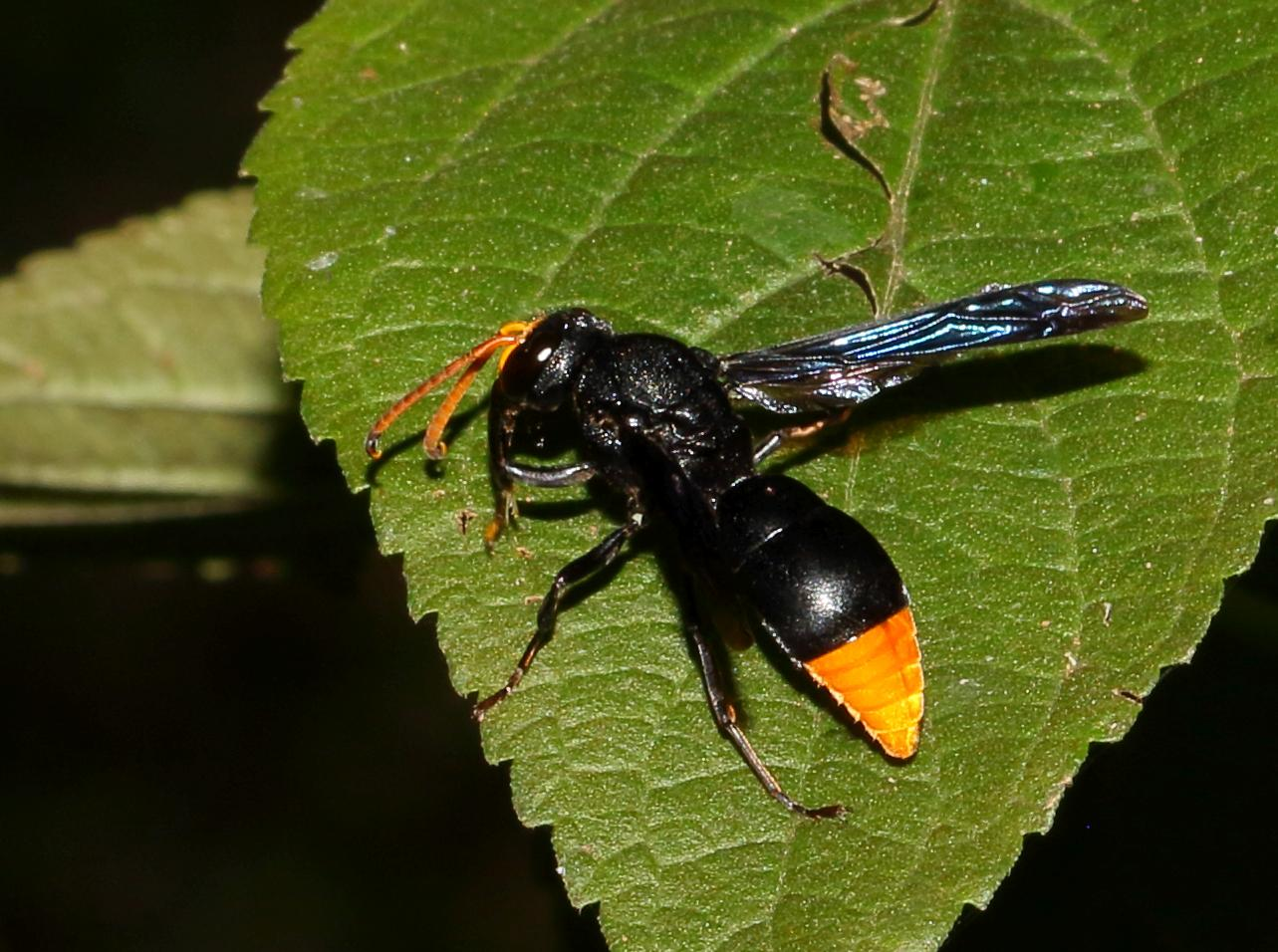

Scientific classification
- Kingdom: Animalia
- Phylum: Arthropoda
- Clade: Pancrustacea
- Class: Insecta
- Order: Hymenoptera
- Family: Vespidae
- Genus: Synagris
- Species: S. maxillosa

Binomial name
- Synagris maxillosa de Saussure, 1863

= Synagris maxillosa =

Species of wasp

Synagris maxillosa is a species of potter wasp in the subfamily Eumeninae of the family Vespidae.
