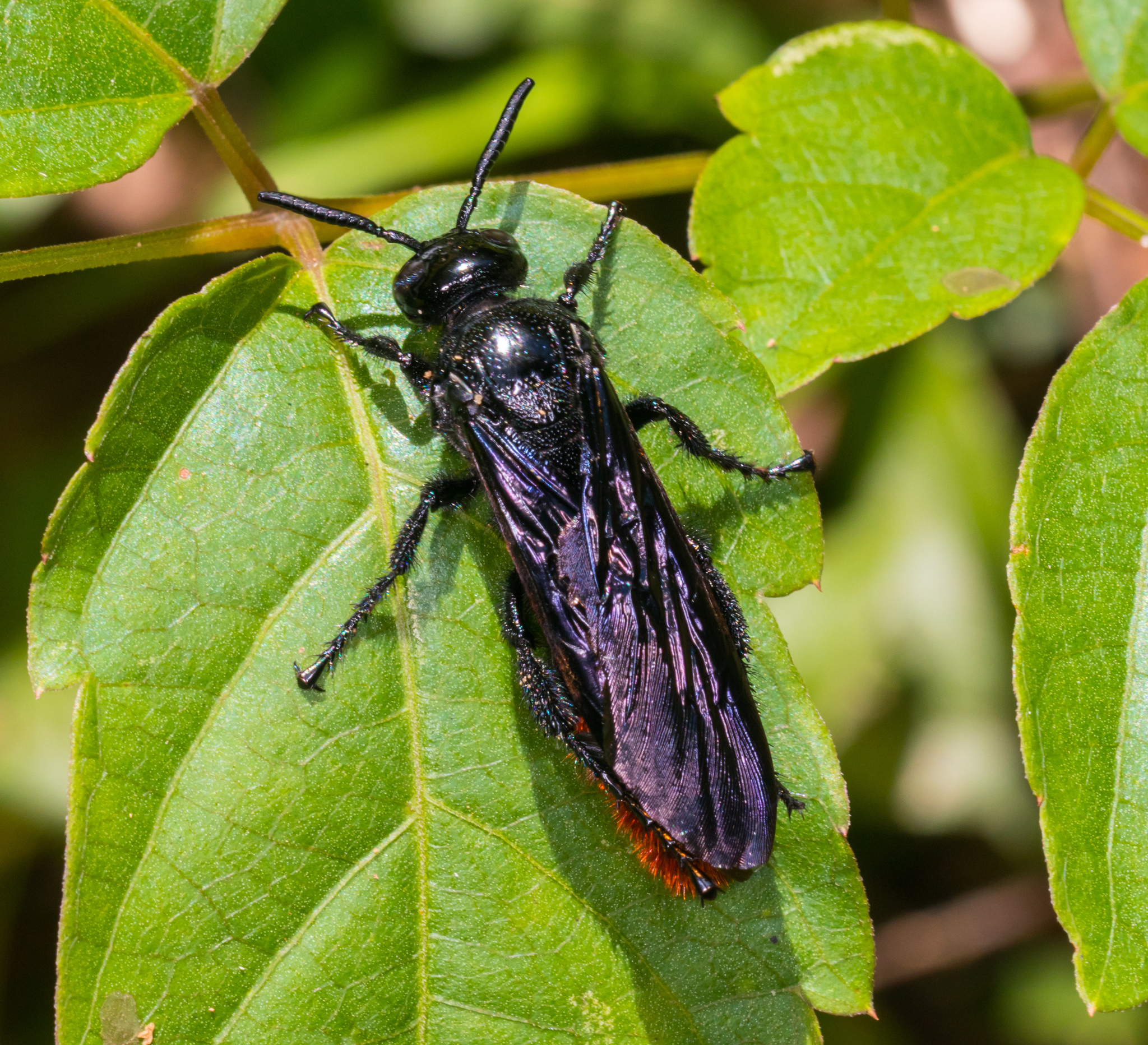
- Liacos erythrosoma

Scientific classification
- Kingdom: Animalia
- Phylum: Arthropoda
- Clade: Pancrustacea
- Class: Insecta
- Order: Hymenoptera
- Family: Scoliidae
- Tribe: Scoliini
- Genus: Liacos; Guérin-Méneville, 1838

= Liacos =

Genus of wasps

Liacos is a genus of Scoliid wasp found throughout Africa, Asia, and Australia.

== Description ==
As part of the tribe Scoliini, the forewings of Liacos wasps have only a single complete recurrent wing vein, though a partial second recurrent vein coalesces with it before reaching the cubital vein. Unlike other Scoliini, the forewing has a third discoidal cell.

== Species ==
There are 10 species of Liacos:

- Liacos analis (Fabricius, 1804)
  - Liacos analis analis (Fabricius, 1804)
  - Liacos analis obiana Micha, 1927
  - Liacos analis palawana Micha, 1927
  - Liacos analis pseudoerythrosoma Micha, 1927
  - Liacos analis semirufa Micha, 1927
- Liacos conigra Micha, 1927
- Liacos erythrosoma (Burmeister, 1854)
  - Liacos erythrosoma erythrosoma (Burmeister, 1854)
  - Liacos erythrosoma aurantiatica Micha, 1927
  - Liacos erythrosoma chosensis Uchida, 1933
  - Liacos erythrosoma cruszi Krombein, 1978
  - Liacos erythrosoma formosana Micha, 1927
  - Liacos erythrosoma fulvopicta Cameron, 1892
  - Liacos erythrosoma hainana Micha, 1927
  - Liacos erythrosoma pyrrhopyga Micha, 1927
  - Liacos erythrosoma sikkimensis Micha, 1927
- Liacos fulgidipennis (Smith, 1859)
- Liacos melanogaster Tsuneki, 1982
- Liacos nigrita (Fabricius, 1781)
  - Liacos nigrita nigrita (Fabricius, 1781)
  - Liacos nigrita halima (Kirby, 1889)
- Liacos sanctithomae Bradley, 1959
- Liacos semipullata Bradley, 1959
- Liacos semperi Betrem, 1928
- Liacos zinuneri Micha, 1927
