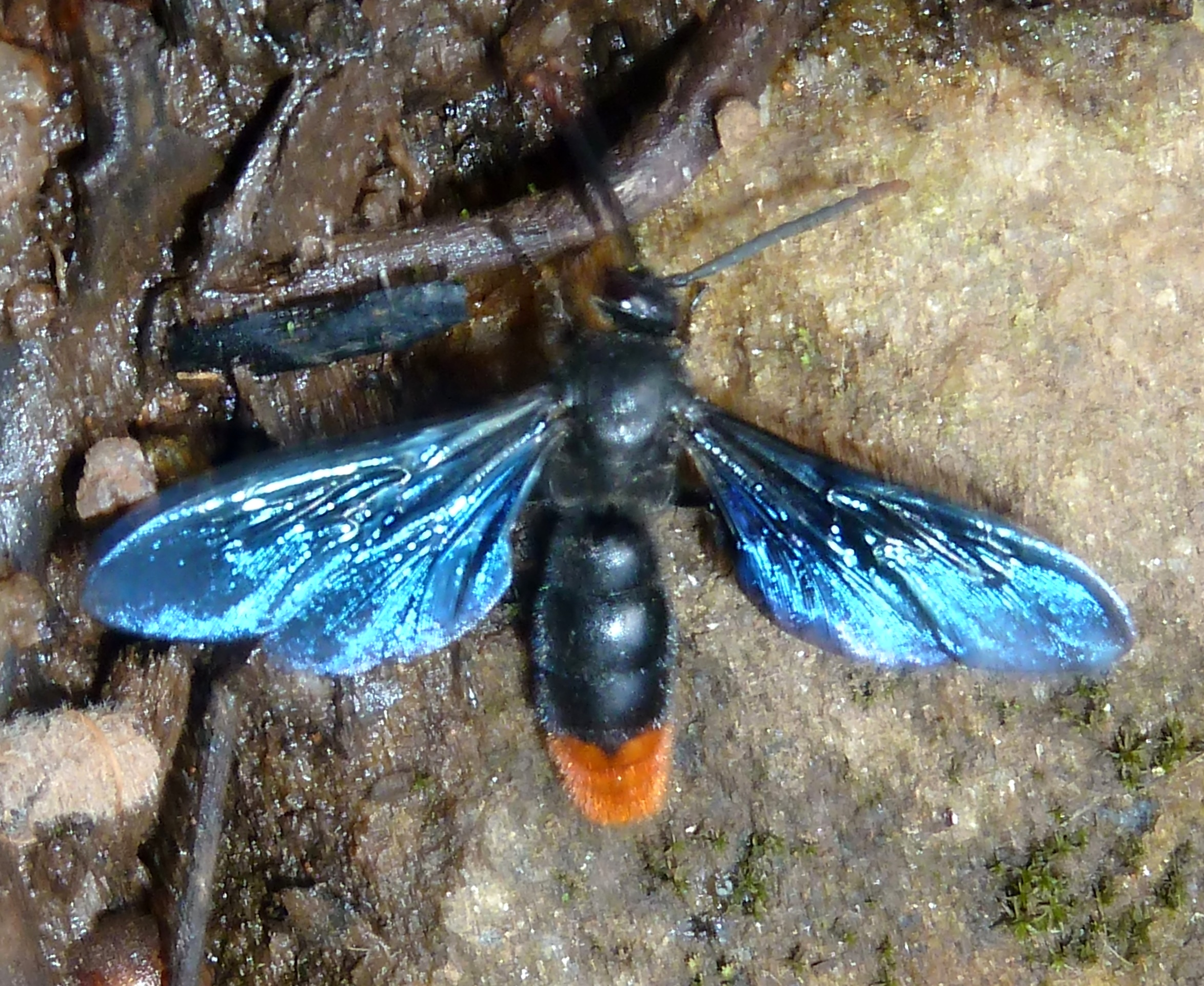
- The type species P. fax in South Africa

Scientific classification
- Domain: Eukaryota
- Kingdom: Animalia
- Phylum: Arthropoda
- Class: Insecta
- Order: Hymenoptera
- Family: Scoliidae
- Tribe: Scoliini
- Genus: Pyrrhoscolia; Bradley, 1957

Type species
- Scolia (Pyrrhoscolia) fax (Bradley, 1957)
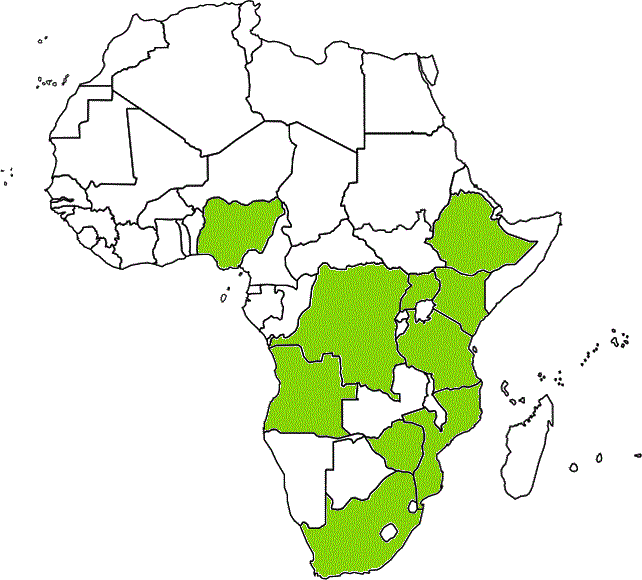
- range of genus

= Pyrrhoscolia =

Genus of wasps

Pyrrhoscolia is a genus of scoliid wasps in the subfamily Scoliinae. It is native to the Afrotropics, where they have been recorded in various Afromontane regions. They are external parasitoids of beetle larvae. The wings of all three species are noted for their brilliant lustre.

== Description ==
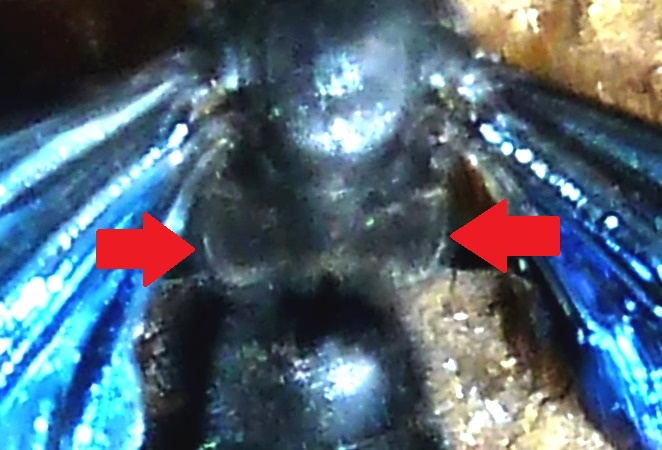
Horizontal lobes of the propodeum

The body and its vestiture are black, apart from the apical segments of the abdomen which are bright reddish in both sexes (3 segments in females, 4 in males). Two species of Scolia are similarly coloured, but have swarthy wings and a red spot in each ocular sinus (or sini oculares, the "bays" bordered by the kidney-shaped eyes). In males, unlike Scolia, the propodeum has two distinct horizontal lobes, which project well behind the insertion of the petiole.

The forewings lack the second recurrent vein and third submarginal cell in both sexes. The wings are closely striolate apically, as with the Scoliidae generally, and feature strong blue, blue-green or golden-green effulgence. The eyes are deeply notched, as with the family generally. On the faces of females the front and frontal space (or spatium frontale, located between the antennae) are separated by a distinct furrow, though not so in males. The male genitalia are distinctive.

== Species ==
Three species belong to the genus Pyrrhoscolia:

- Pyrrhoscolia fax (Bradley, 1957) — Angola, Democratic Republic of Congo, Ethiopia, Kenya, Mozambique, South Africa, Tanzania, Zimbabwe
- Pyrrhoscolia usambaraensis (Cameron, 1910) — Tanzania, Uganda
- Pyrrhoscolia nigeriensis Bradley, 1959 — Nigeria
