= James Chester Bradley =

American entomologist (1884–1975)

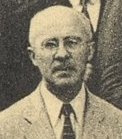
J. Chester Bradley at the International Congress of Entomology in Madrid, 1935

James Chester Bradley (1884 in West Chester, Pennsylvania – 1975 in Ithaca, New York) was an American entomologist who specialised in Hymenoptera.

He graduated from Cornell University (A.B. 1906, Ph.D. 1910) and the University of California (M.S. 1907). He was an assistant professor of entomology at Cornell from 1911 to 1920, and professor and curator of invertebrate zoology from 1920 to 1952.

James Chester Bradley wrote very many entomological papers. He is especially known for his works on Evaniidae and Scoliidae.
