= Giovanni Gribodo =

Italian civil engineer, architect and entomologist

Giovanni Gribodo (13 May 1846 – 24 September 1924) was an Italian civil engineer, architect and entomologist. As an architect he was part of the Art Nouveau architectural movement known as the Liberty style. As an entomologist, he was an important contributor to the global knowledge of the insect order Hymenoptera, which includes sawflies, wasps, bees, and ants.

== Architectural career ==
Gribodo graduated from the Scuola di Applicazione per gli Ingegneri in Turin ("Technical School for Engineers", now the Politecnico di Torino) in 1866 and took up the post of assistant of Practical Geometry and Applied Descriptive Geometry there. As an architect he designed a number of buildings, some of which are regarded as some of the best examples of Liberty Style in Turin. Many of Gribodo's buildings can be found in the area between the Corso Francia and the Via Cibrario, in the areas of Borgo San Paolo up to edge of the Borgo della Crocetta in Turin. He was best known for creating delicate smaller houses frequently in the Via Piffetti and on the hillside in the Art Nouveau style which he interpreted with his own eclectic taste; in Italy this style was known as Stile Liberty, taking its name from the Liberty store in London. Some examples include the Casa Masino, famous for featuring a sphinx; Casa Giuliano on Via Gatti; and the 1908 Palzio Pola Pola palace in Via Piffetti, at Via Beaumont. As an architect he also published a report on the building style used in the Turin Italian Exposition of 1872. He seems to have retired from architecture in 1919 as from then until the end of his life he seems to have spent all his time conducting entomological research.

== Entomology ==
Gribodo's contribution to entomology was mainly around the study of the Hymenoptera. He described many new taxa, and became a respected member of the global entomological community. He co-operated with other hymenopterologists with museums and scientific institutions, both at home and abroad, who competed to work with him. He had a long and fruitful relationship with the Museo Civico di Storia Naturale di Genova and he was a prime actor in the creation of the Museum's Hymenoptera collection at the end of the 19th century, being involved in the study of the specimens which he collected in Italy and overseas in the course of several expeditions.

Gribodo published many papers between 1873 and 1896, which show that he was able to work extensively on his entomological studies; even then, there were two brief periods of inactivity in 1876–78 and in, 1885–91. From 1896, he ceased publishing on Hymenoptera and it was during this period that his career as an architect was at its peak. He continued to add to his own collection in his spare time, either by collecting specimens locally in Piedmont or through purchase from fellow collectors or insect dealers. After this period he was able to dedicate himself to his studies of Hymenoptera on a full-time basis, including the publication of a number of papers, as well as undertaking work to reorganise his very large collection of entomological specimens. At the age of 74, in July 1920, he is recorded as taking part in an entomological trip to Piedmont's Susa valley which lasted two days. In the early part of 1923 he developed a serious circulatory disorder which caused debilitating pain, but he recovered from this and returned to his work. However, in the spring of 1924, he suffered a relapse of greater severity and after months of painful illness he died on September 24, 1924. He worked for as long as he could, and his last paper was published posthumously.

Gribodo's collection of entomological specimens was purchased by the Museo Civico di Storia Naturale di Genova in December 1924, where it is still held. It includes his own specimens as well as many collected by other renowned Hymenopterists such as Theodore Dru Alison Cockerell, Heinrich Friese, Alexander Mocsáry, Henri Louis Frédéric de Saussure and Frederick Smith. The collection also contains many of the important type specimens which were originally collected and named by Félix Édouard Guérin-Méneville. The collection is now housed in boxes in the museum and the museum was able to add the collection of cuckoo wasps of the family Chrysididae, which Gribodo had given to Fabio Invrea shortly before his death, on its procurement of Invrea's collection subsequent to the latter's death. The collection is an extensive representation of Aculeata although has no ants.

Gribodo's library, including some manuscripts and correspondence, was donated by his daughters to the Civic Library of Turin, where it remains. He was one of the first members of the Società Entomologica Italiana as well as being a member of many other societies, including the Reale Accademia di Agricoltura di Torino, Società Italiana di Scienze naturali and various foreign entomological and scientific associations.

== Publications and taxa ==
Gribodo published 42 papers during his life and left one unpublished manuscript on the Hymenoptera of Tunisia; these are listed in Penati and Mariotti (2015), which includes a comprehensive list of the 377 taxa named by Gribodo, 199 of which are still regarded as valid.

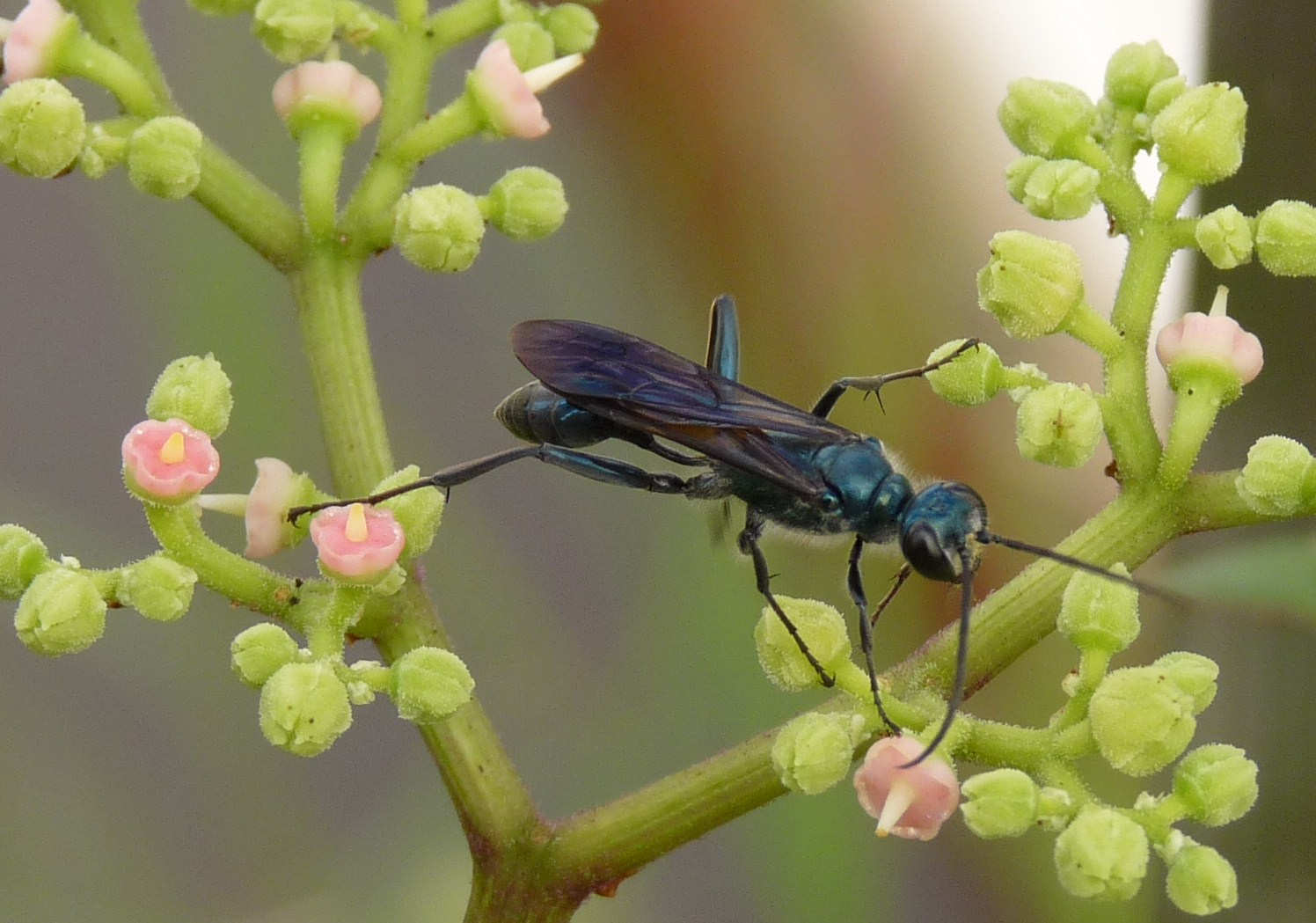
Chalybion japonicum: a wasp named by Gribodo

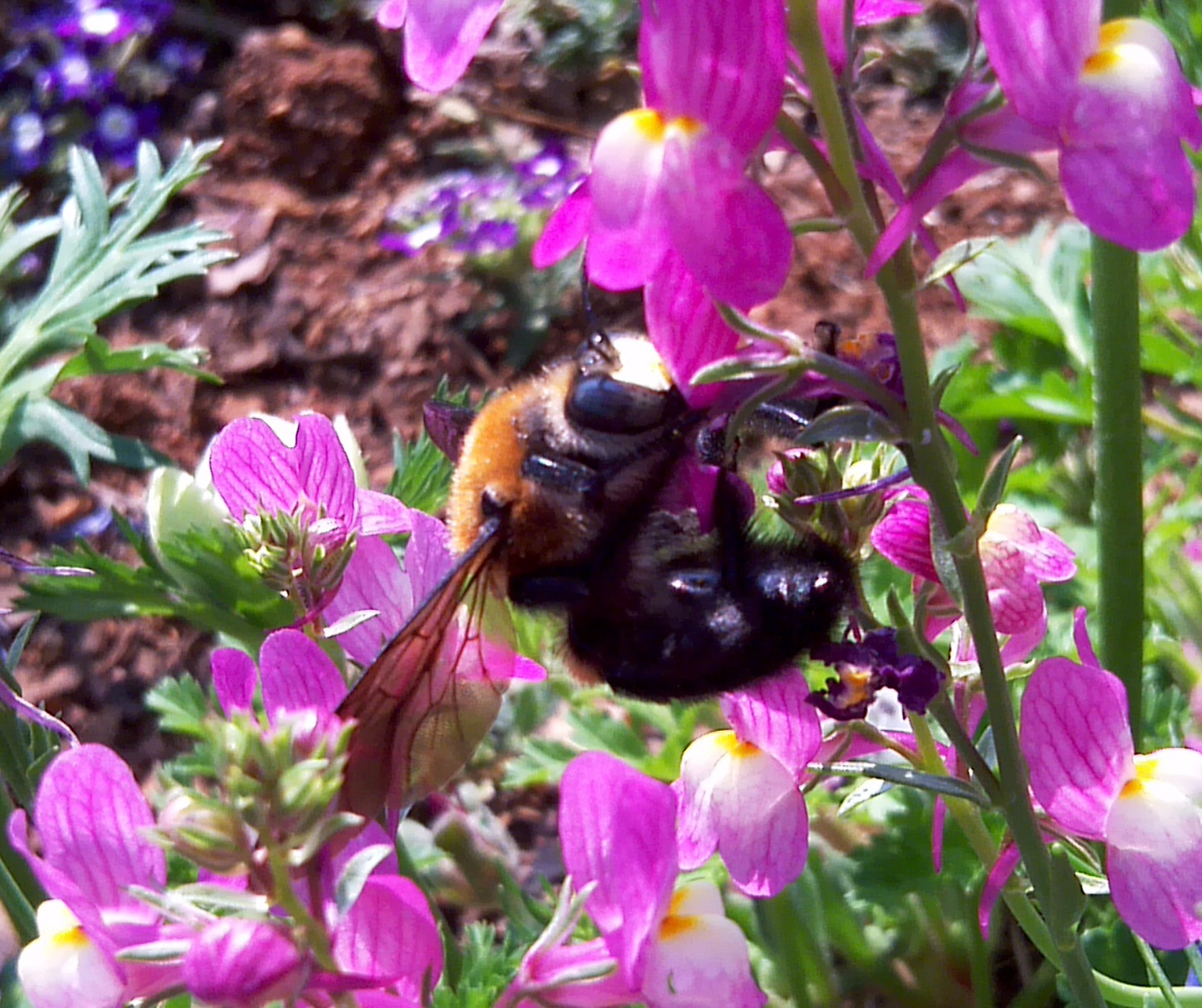
Xylocopa erythrina, a carpenter bee named by Gribodo
