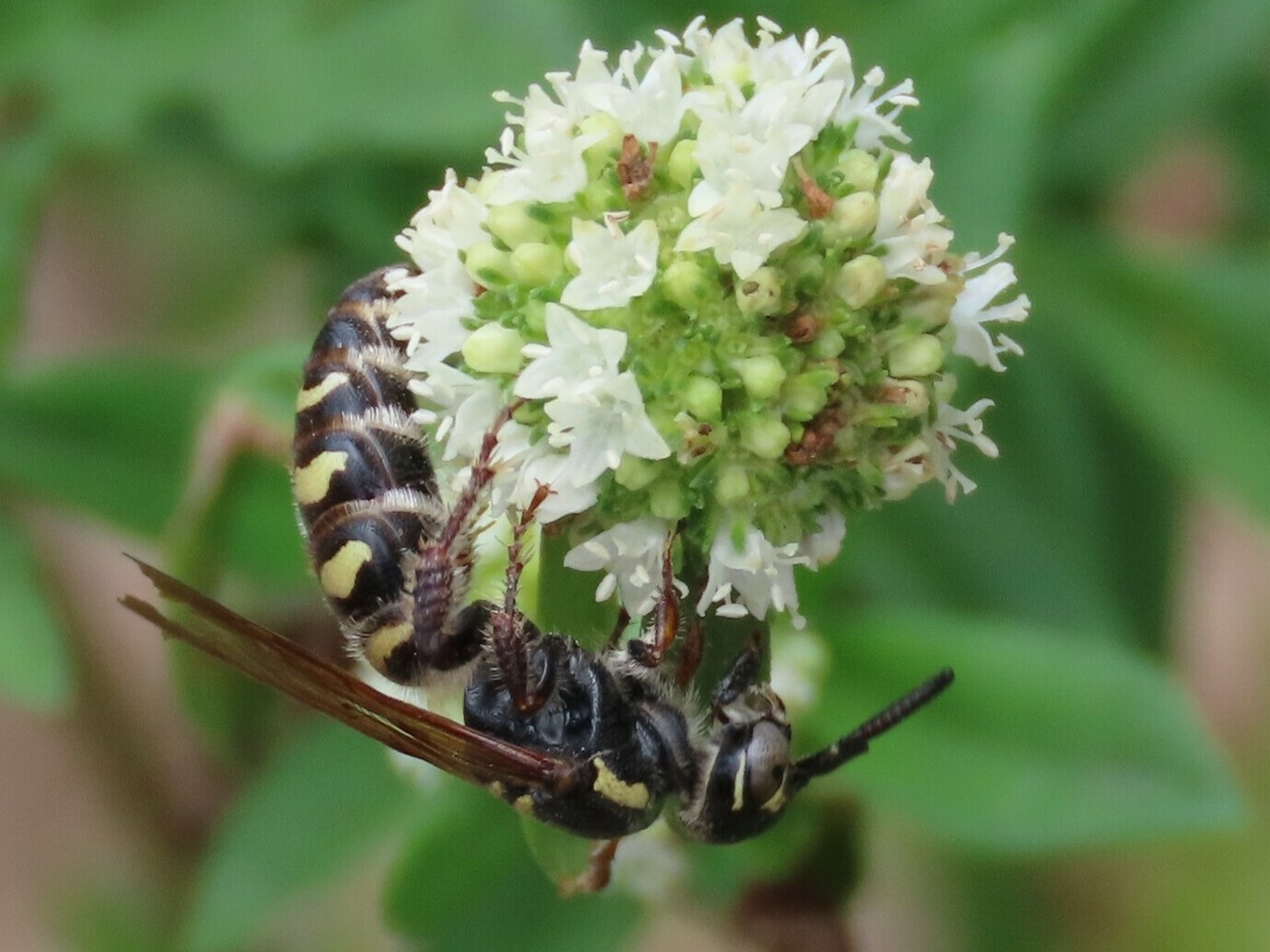
- Female Colpa octomaculata hermione

Scientific classification
- Kingdom: Animalia
- Phylum: Arthropoda
- Clade: Pancrustacea
- Class: Insecta
- Order: Hymenoptera
- Family: Scoliidae
- Subfamily: Scoliinae
- Tribe: Trielidini
- Genus: Colpa
- Subgenus: Colpa (Colpa)
- Species: C. octomaculata

Binomial name
- Colpa octomaculata (Say, 1823)

= Colpa octomaculata =

Species of wasp

Colpa octomaculata is a species of scoliid wasp native to North America.

== Subspecies ==
There are 4 subspecies of Colpa octomaculata:

- Colpa octomaculata octomaculata (Say, 1823)
- Colpa octomaculata hermione (Banks, 1912)
- Colpa octomaculata texensis (Saussure, 1858)
- Colpa octomaculata xantiana (Saussure, 1864)

== Gallery ==
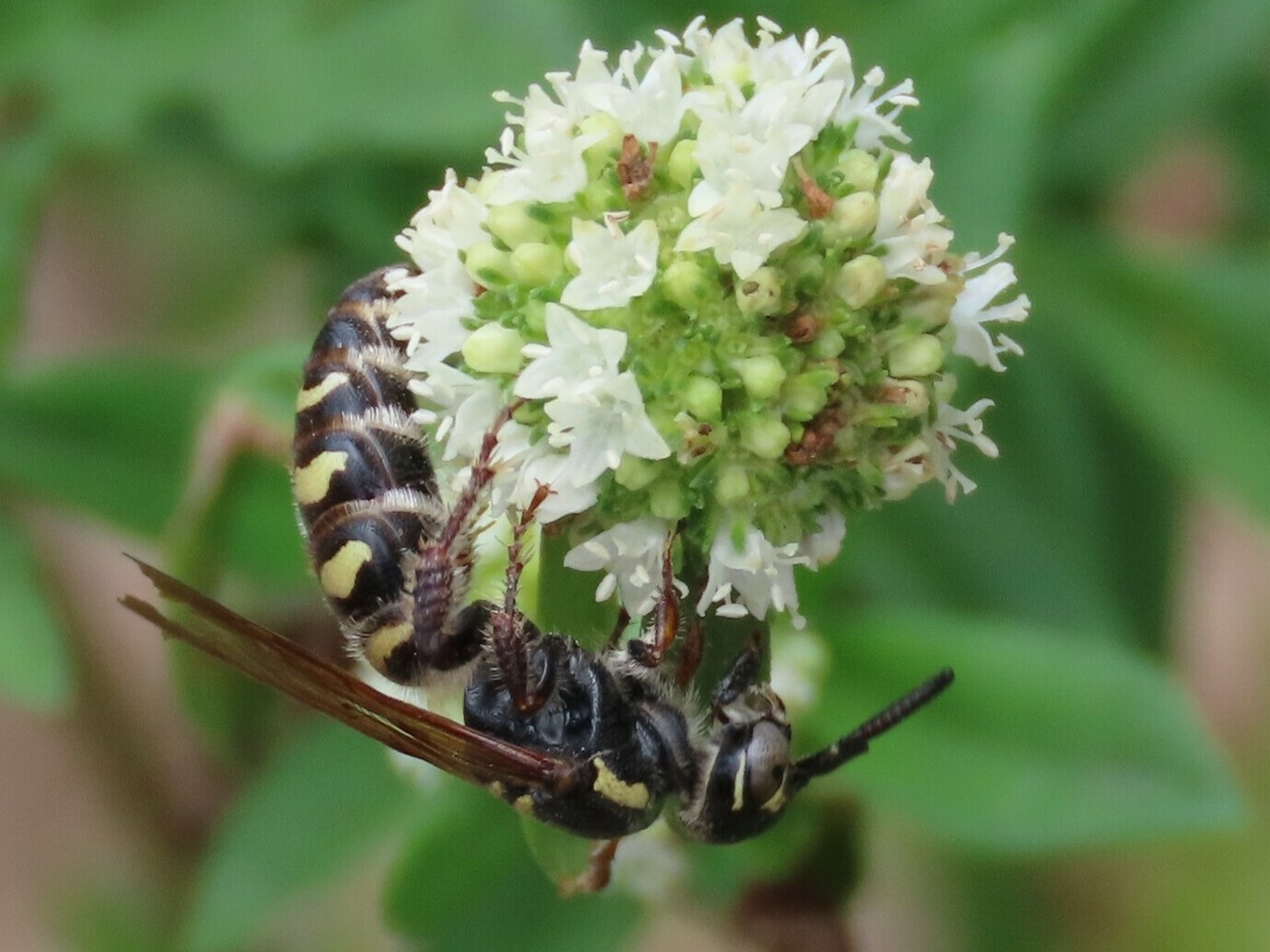
Colpa octomaculata hermione female

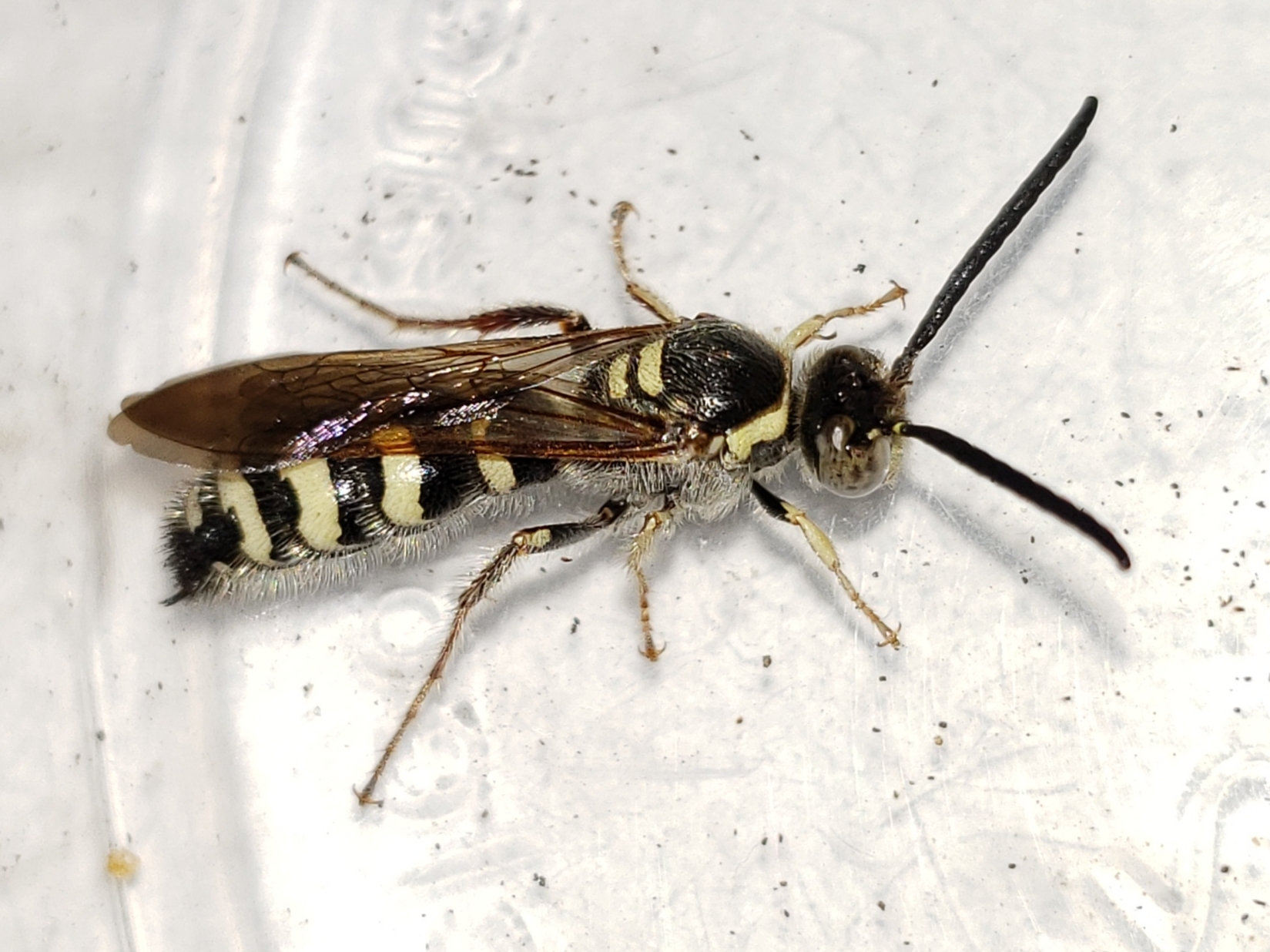
Colpa octomaculata hermione male

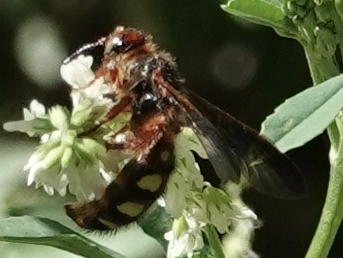
Colpa octomaculata octomaculata female

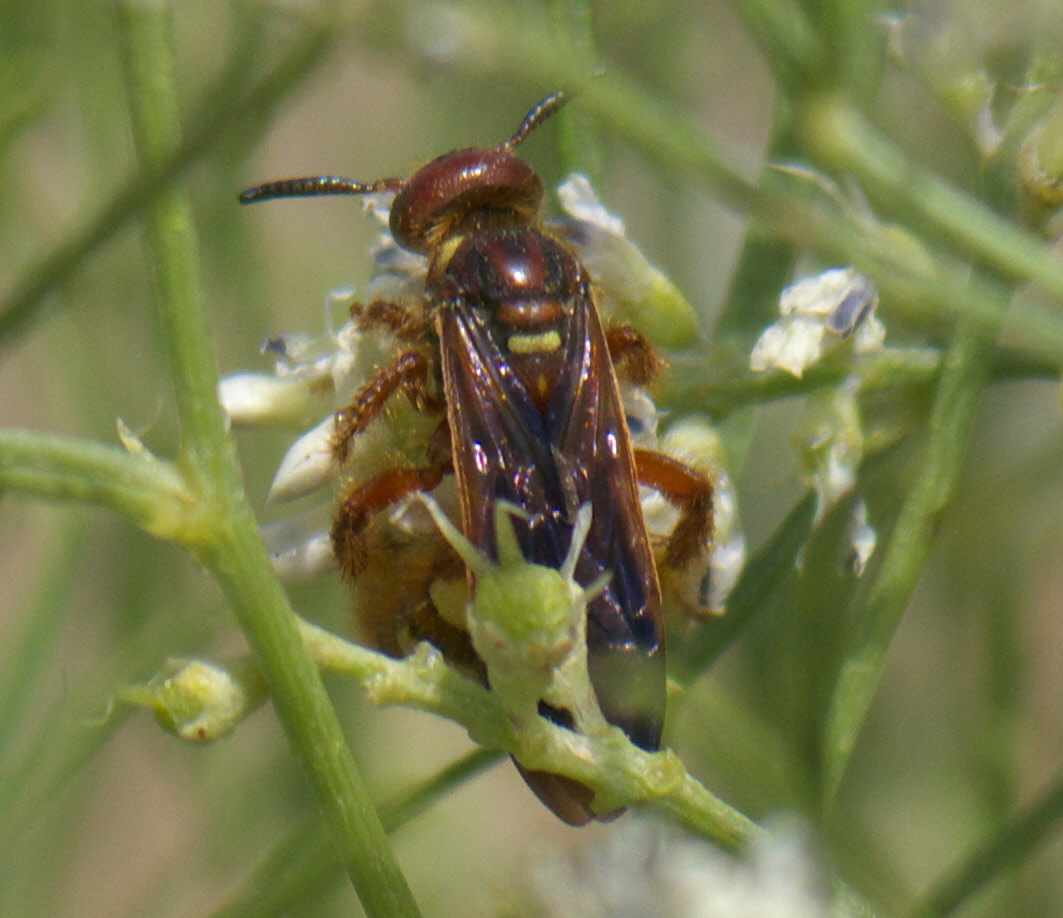
Colpa octomaculata texensis female

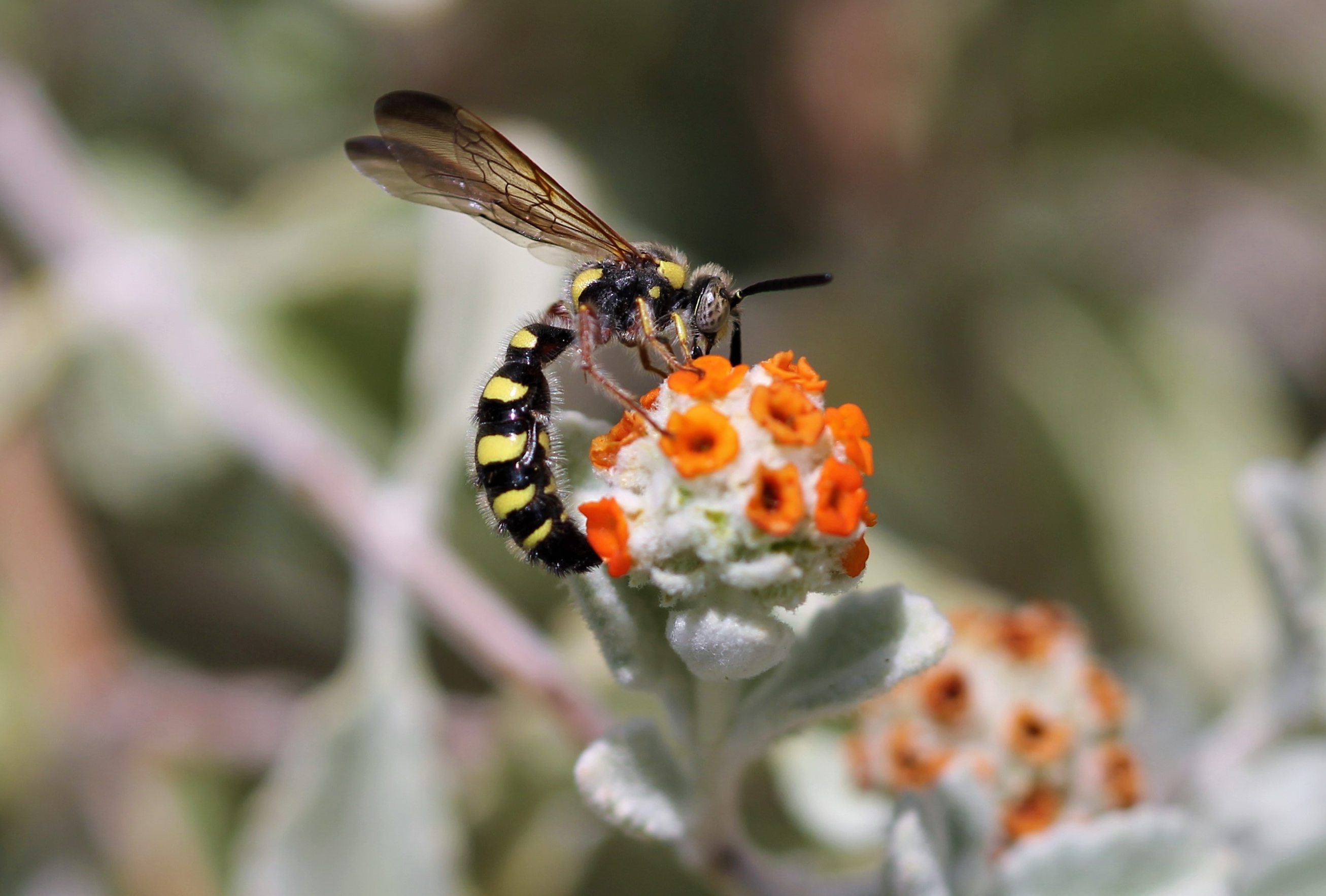
Colpa octomaculata texensis male

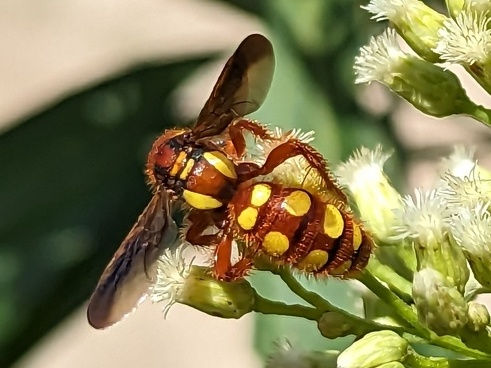
Colpa octomaculata xantiana female
