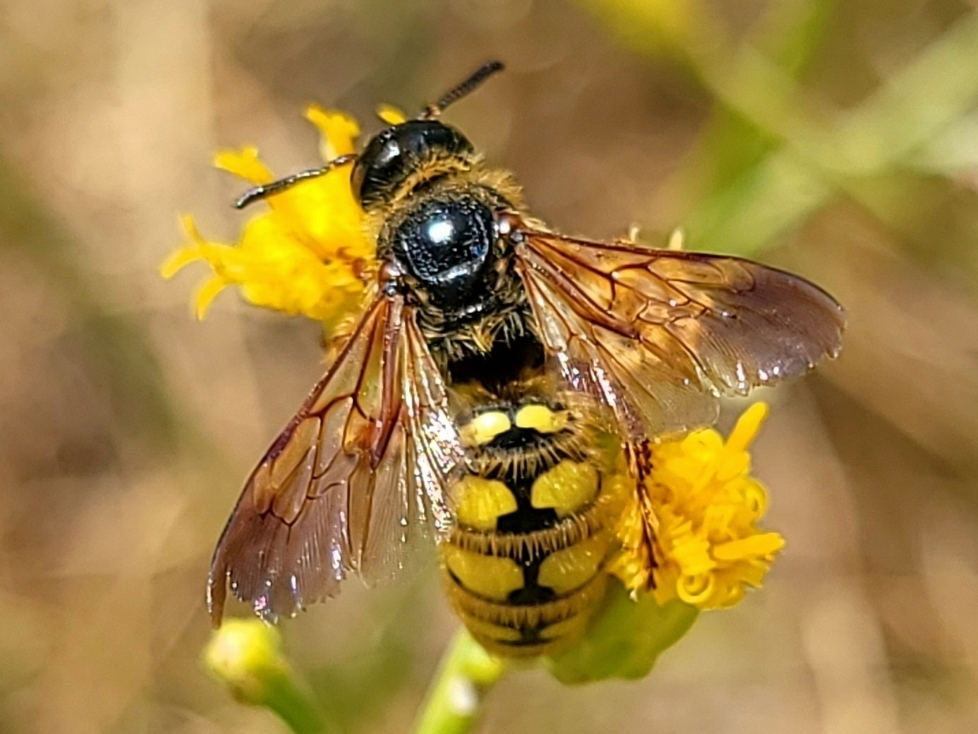

Scientific classification
- Kingdom: Animalia
- Phylum: Arthropoda
- Clade: Pancrustacea
- Class: Insecta
- Order: Hymenoptera
- Family: Scoliidae
- Subfamily: Scoliinae
- Tribe: Trielidini
- Genus: Colpa
- Subgenus: Colpa (Crioscolia)
- Species: C. alcione

Binomial name
- Colpa alcione (Banks, 1917)

Synonyms
- Trielis alcione Banks, 1917; Crioscolia alcione (Banks, 1917)

= Colpa alcione =

Species of wasp

Colpa alcione is a species of scoliid wasp native to western North America.

== Gallery ==
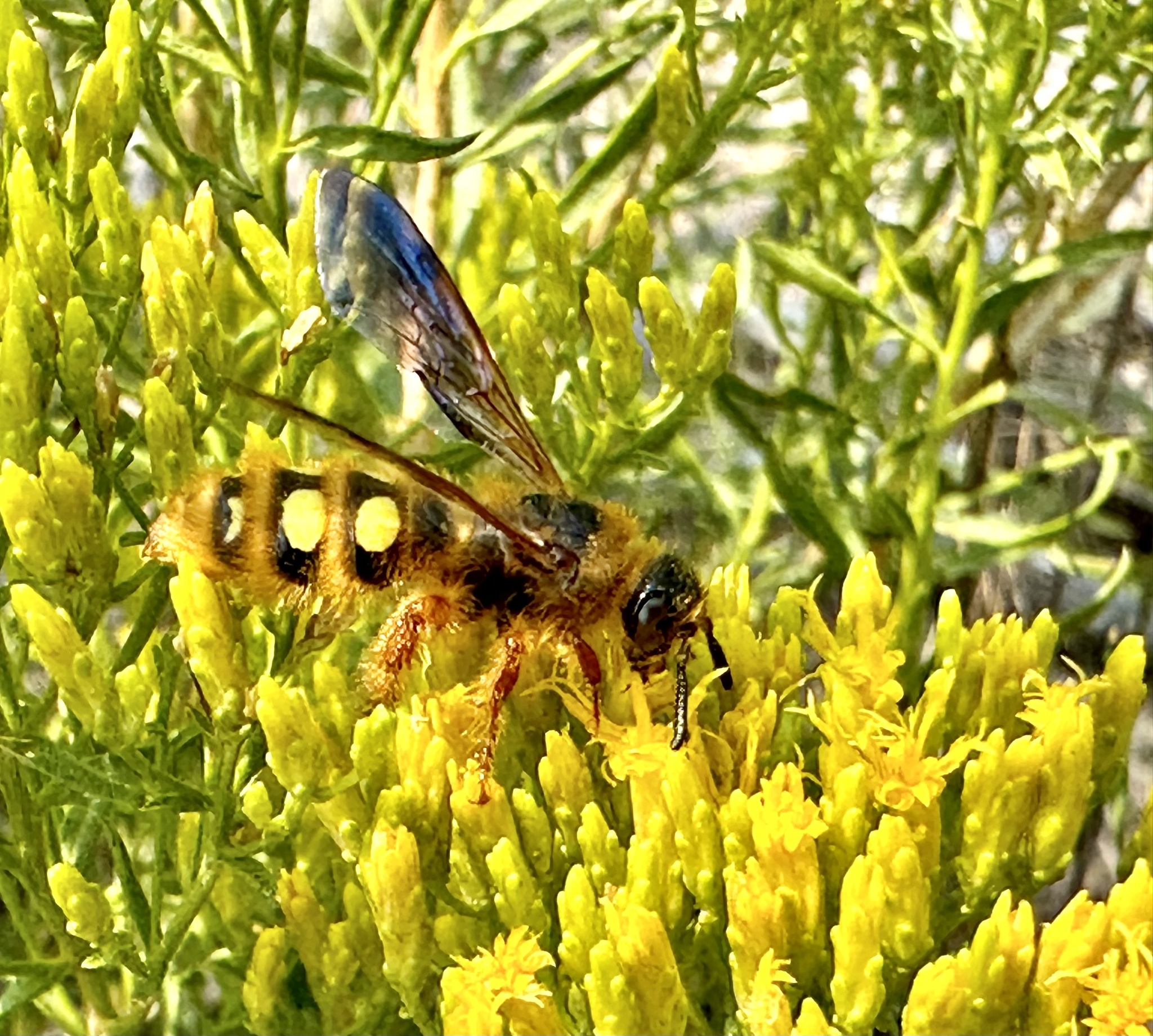
Colpa alcione female

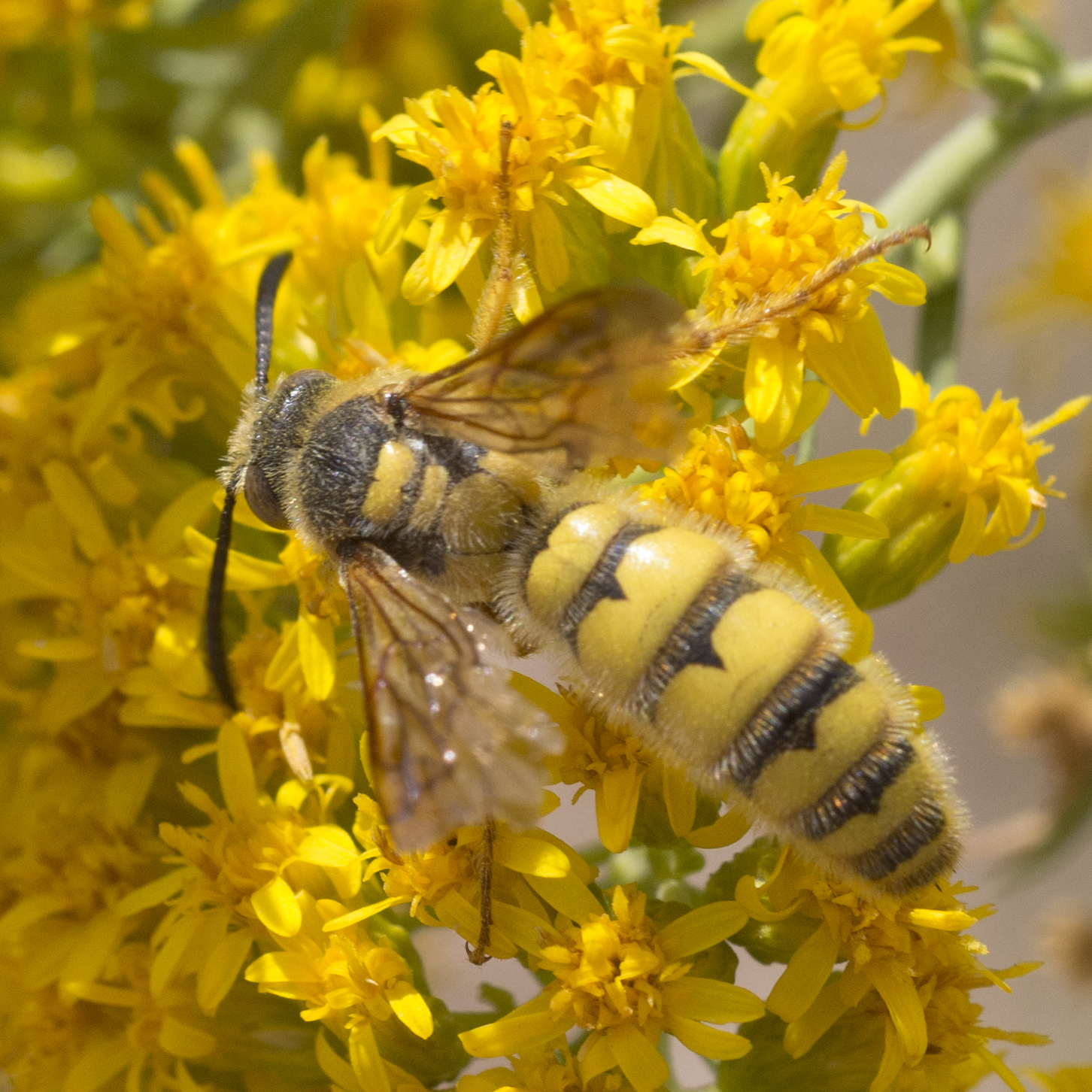
Colpa alcione male
