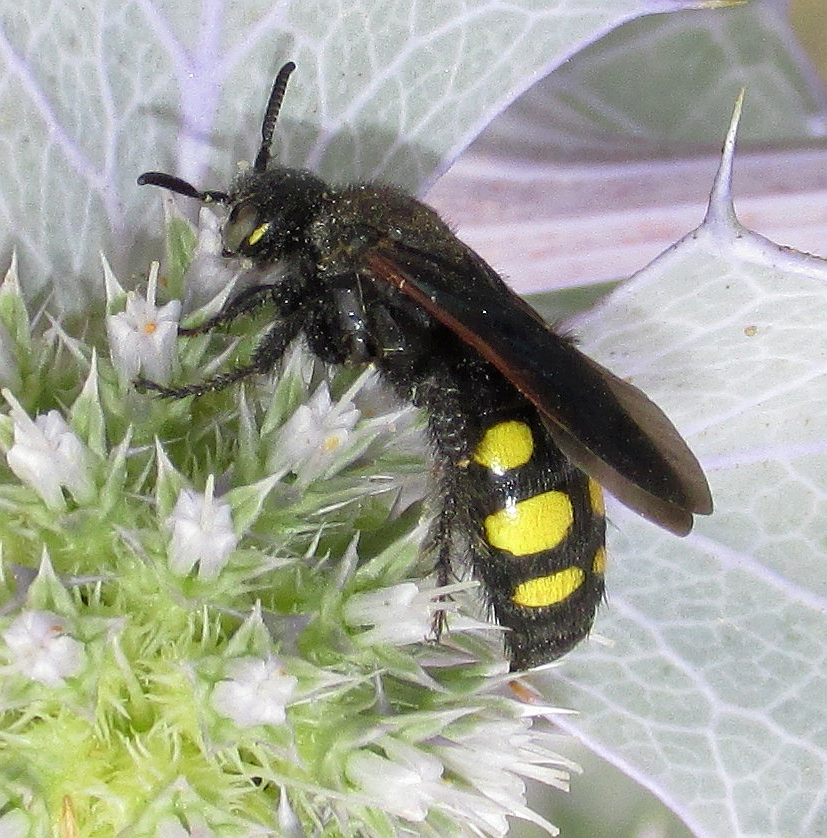
- Colpa sexmaculata

Scientific classification
- Kingdom: Animalia
- Phylum: Arthropoda
- Clade: Pancrustacea
- Class: Insecta
- Order: Hymenoptera
- Family: Scoliidae
- Subfamily: Scoliinae
- Tribe: Trielidini
- Genus: Colpa; Dufour, 1841

Synonyms
- Trielis Saussure, 1863; Campsoscolia Betrem, 1922

= Colpa =

Genus of wasps

Colpa is a genus of scoliid wasp.

== Taxonomy and phylogeny ==
Despite historical treatment under the tribe Campsomerini, phylogenetic analysis revealed the genus to instead be sister to the tribe Scoliini. As a result, it was excluded from Campsomerini. Two possibilities were presented, pending results on the placement of Guigliana and Dasyscolia: either to treat a third tribe, Colpini, or to transfer the genera to Scoliini. Mitochontrial phylogenetic analysis corroborated that Colpa and Guigliana represented a third tribe, which they named Trielidini instead of Colpini to comply with ICZN guidelines.

== Species ==
There are 24 species recognized in this genus:

=== Subgenus Colpa (Carbonelis) ===
- Colpa carbonaria (Klug, 1832)
- Colpa siderea (Costa, 1893)

=== Subgenus Colpa (Colpa) ===
- Colpa klugii (Vander Linden, 1827)
- Colpa octomaculata (Say, 1823)
  - Colpa octomaculata octomaculata (Say, 1823)
  - Colpa octomaculata hermione (Banks, 1912)
  - Colpa octomaculata texensis (Saussure, 1858)
  - Colpa octomaculata xantiana (Saussure, 1864)
- Colpa pollenifera (Viereck, 1906)
- Colpa sexmaculata (Fabricius, 1781)

=== Subgenus Colpa (Crioscolia) ===
- Colpa alcione (Banks, 1917)
- Colpa flammicoma (Bradley, 1928)
- Colpa moricei (Saunders, 1910)
- Colpa punctum (Saussure, 1891)
- Colpa tartara (Saussure, 1880)
  - Colpa tartara tartara (Saussure, 1880)
  - Colpa tartara mongoiica (Morawitz, 1889)

=== Subgenus Colpa (Heterelis) ===
- Colpa braunsi (Turner, 1912)
- Colpa expeditionis Betrem, 1972
- Colpa massadae Osten, 2002
- Colpa mima (du Buysson, 1897)
- Colpa pardalina (Gerstaecker, 1857)
- Colpa quinquecincta (Fabricius, 1793)
  - Colpa quinquecincta quinquecincta (Fabricius, 1793)
  - Colpa quinquecincta maroccana (Gribodo, 1895)
  - Colpa quinquecincta occidentalis (Betrem & Bradley, 1972)
  - Colpa quinquecincta rudaba (Kirby, 1889)
- Colpa schulthessi Betrem, 1972
- Colpa stigma (Saussure, 1859)
- Colpa technowi (Turner, 1919)

=== Subgenus Colpa (Junodelis) ===
- Colpa junodi Betrem & Bradley, 1972
- Colpa loveridgei Betrem, 1972
- Colpa voiensis Betrem, 1972

=== Subgenus Colpa (Nyaselis) ===
- Colpa nyasensis Betrem, 1972

== Gallery ==
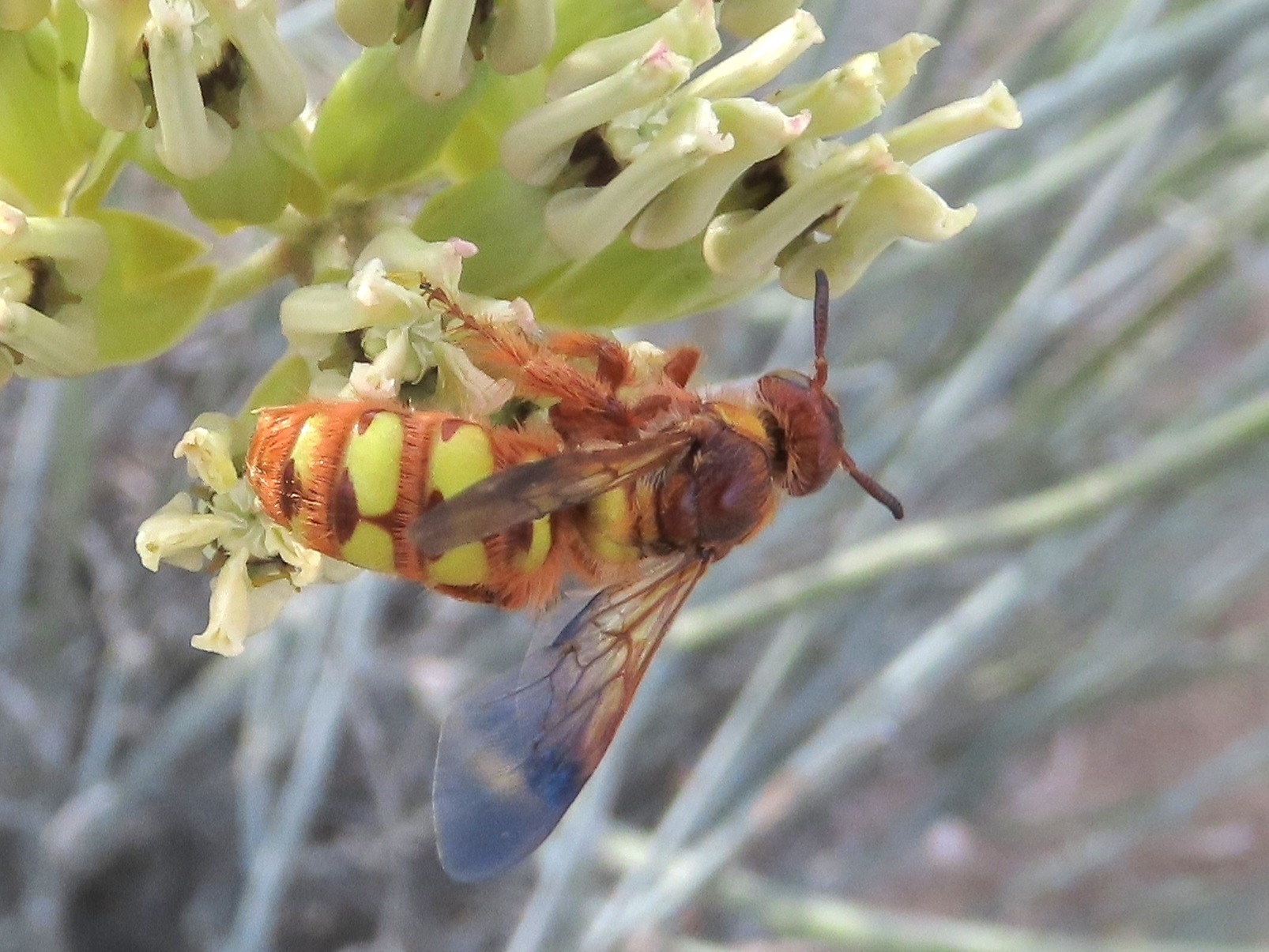
Colpa flammicoma female

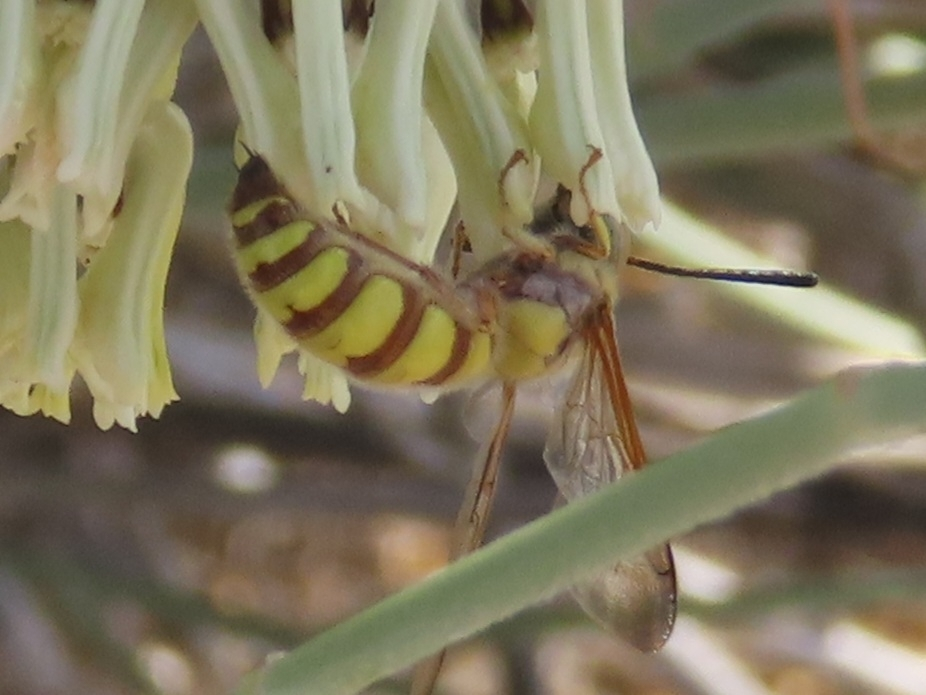
Colpa flammicoma male

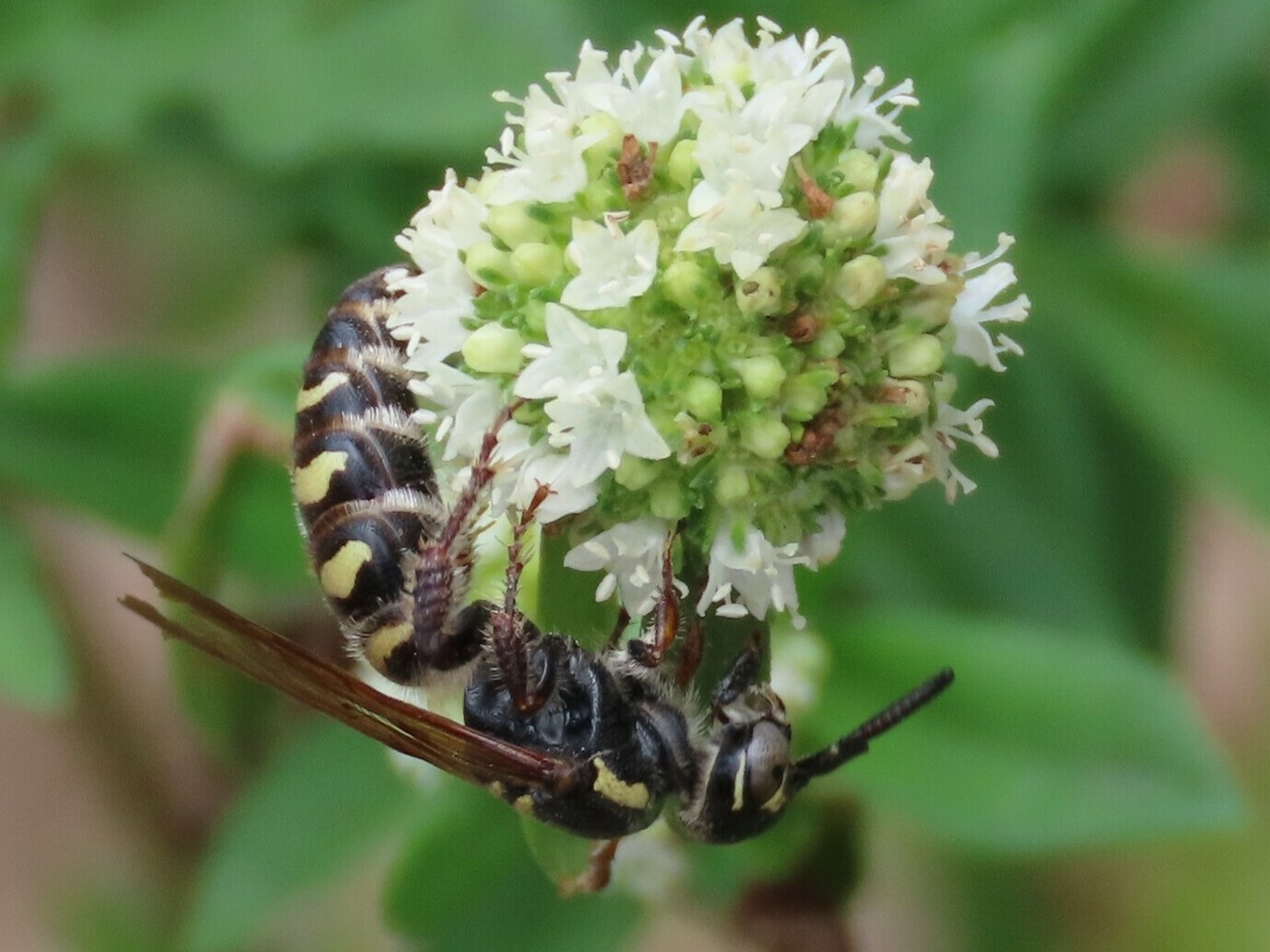
Colpa octomaculata hermione female

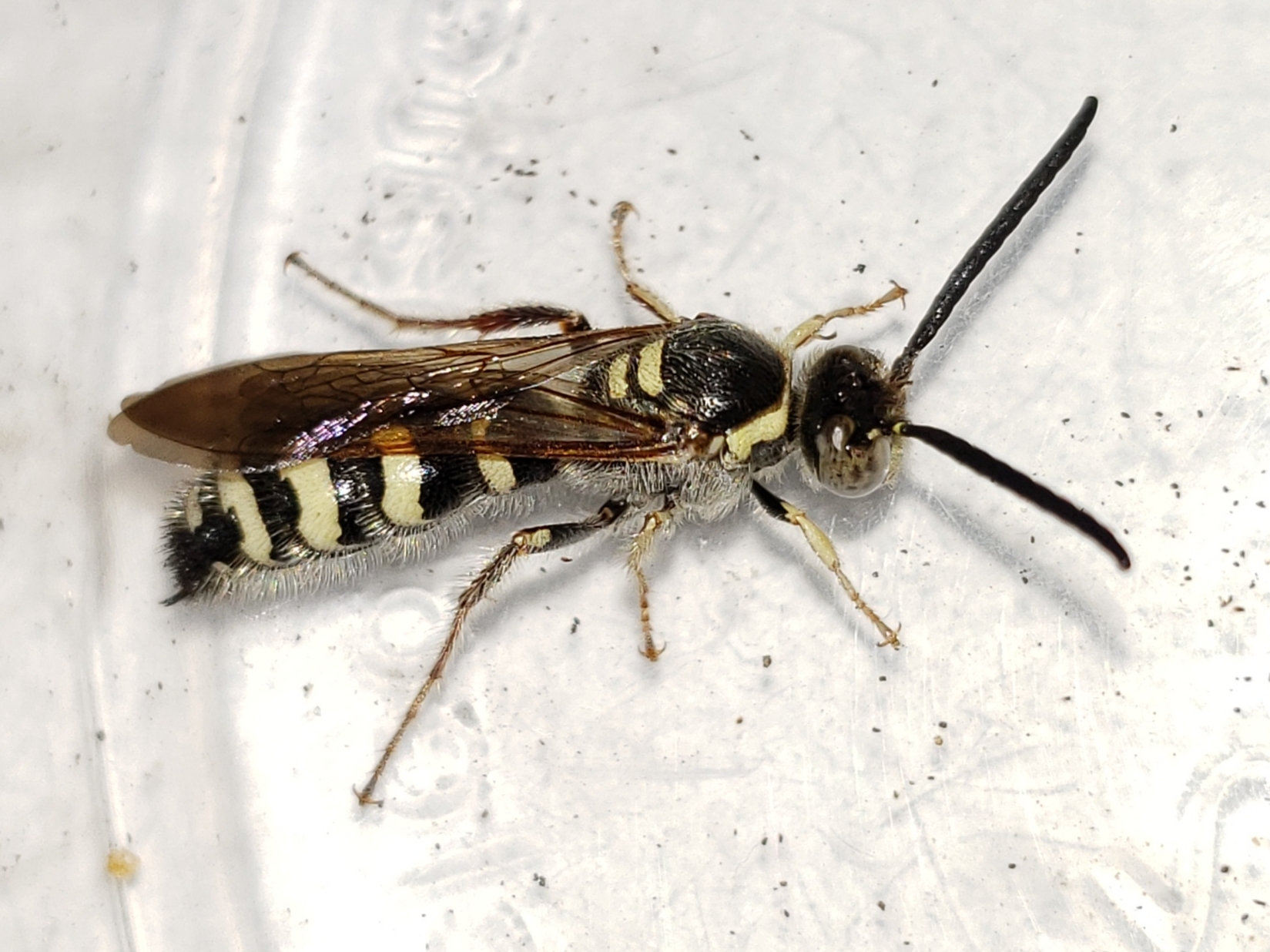
Colpa octomaculata hermione male

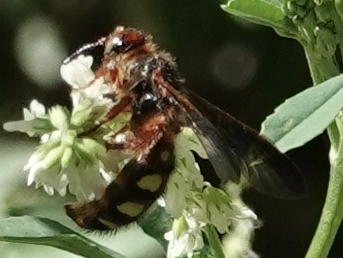
Colpa octomaculata octomaculata female

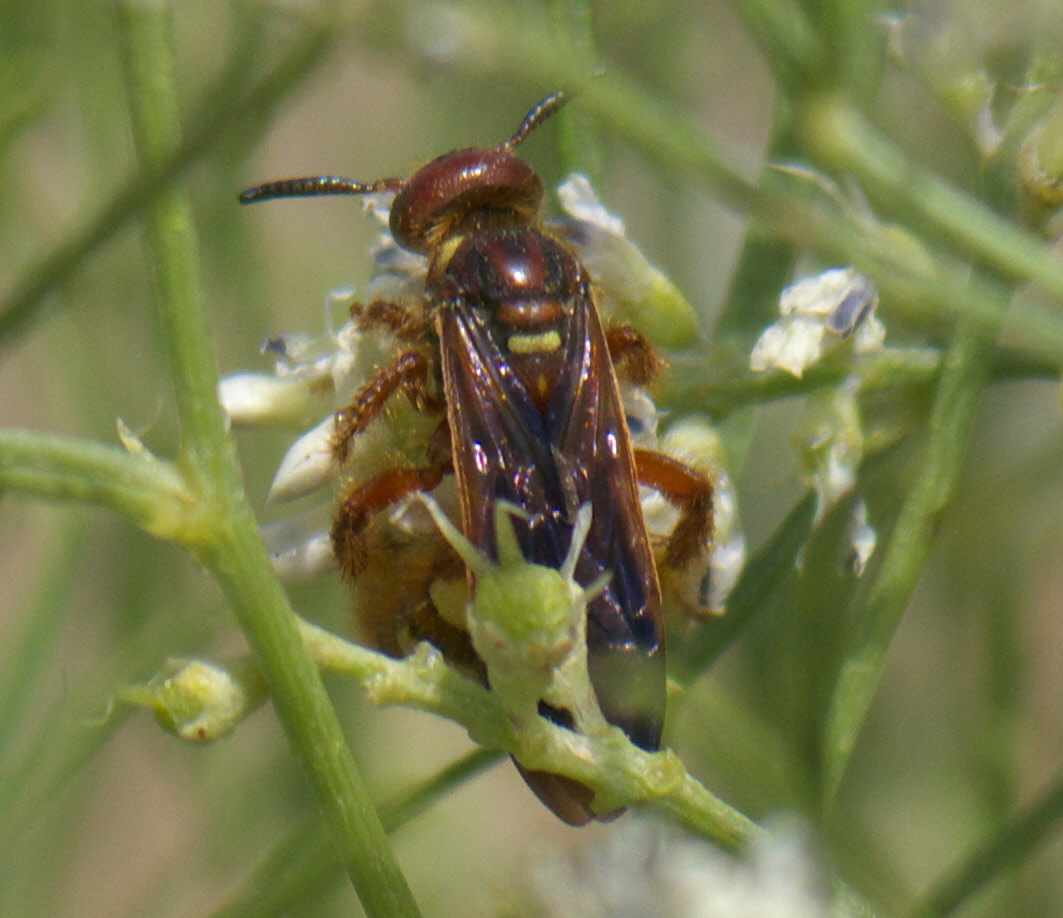
Colpa octomaculata texensis female

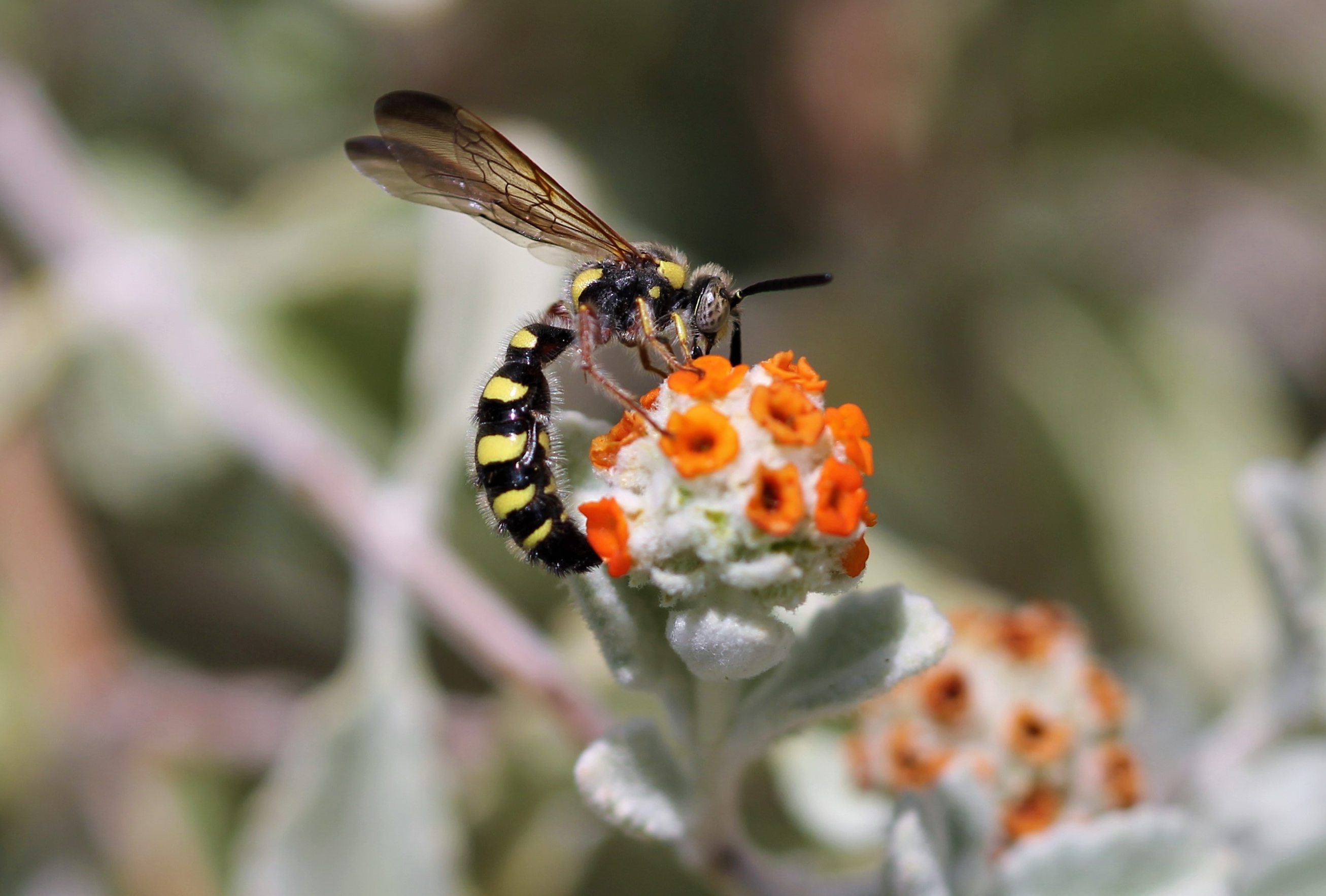
Colpa octomaculata texensis male

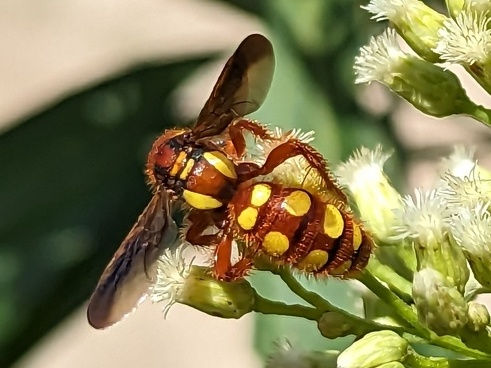
Colpa octomaculata xantiana female

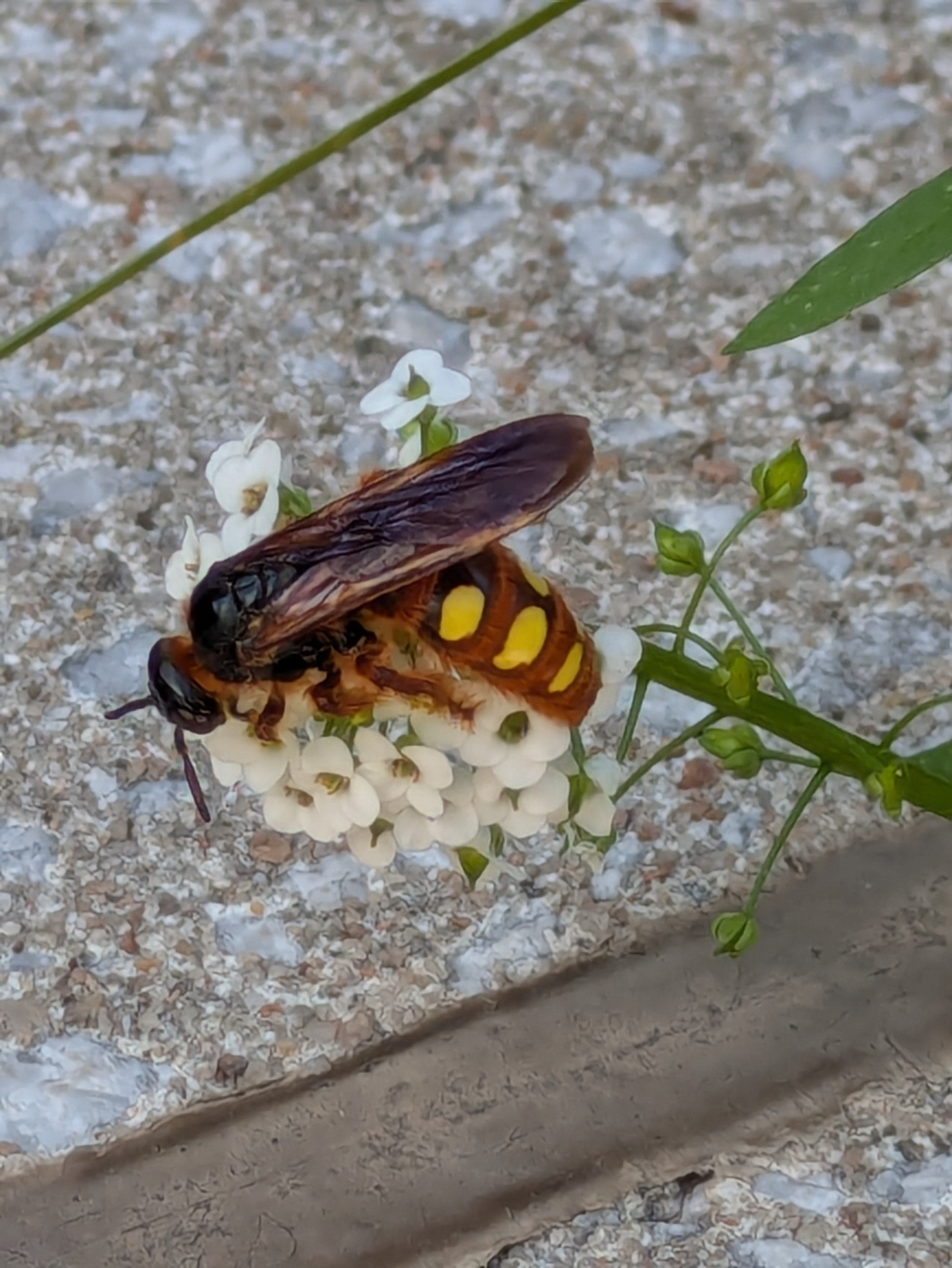
Colpa pollenifera female

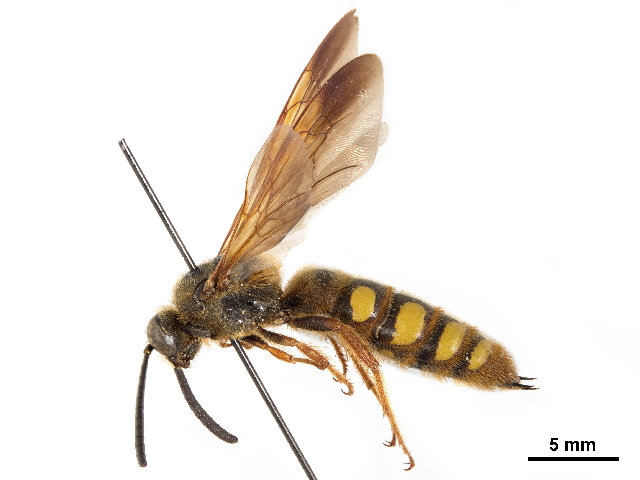
Colpa pollenifera male

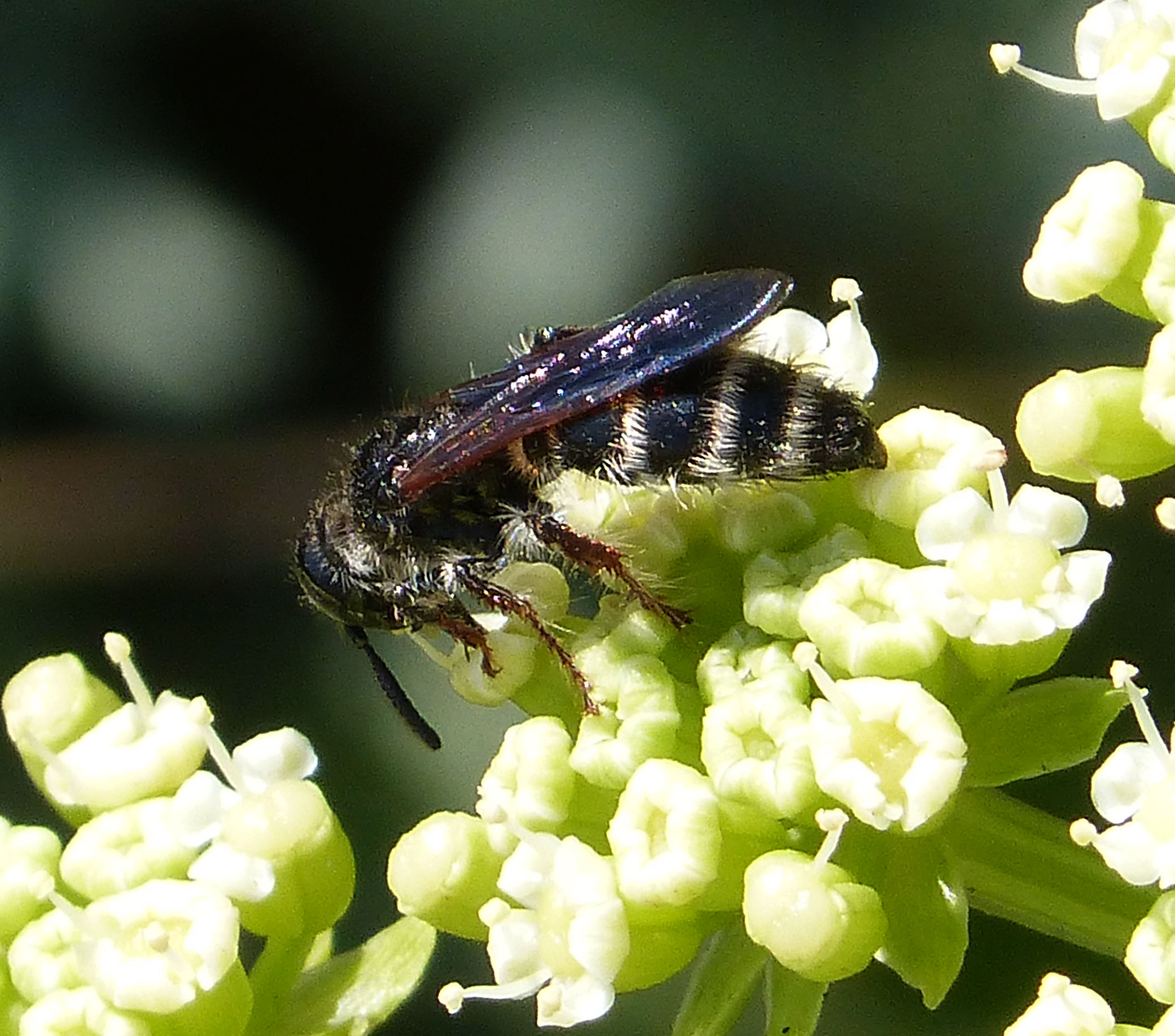
Colpa quinquecincta occidentalis female

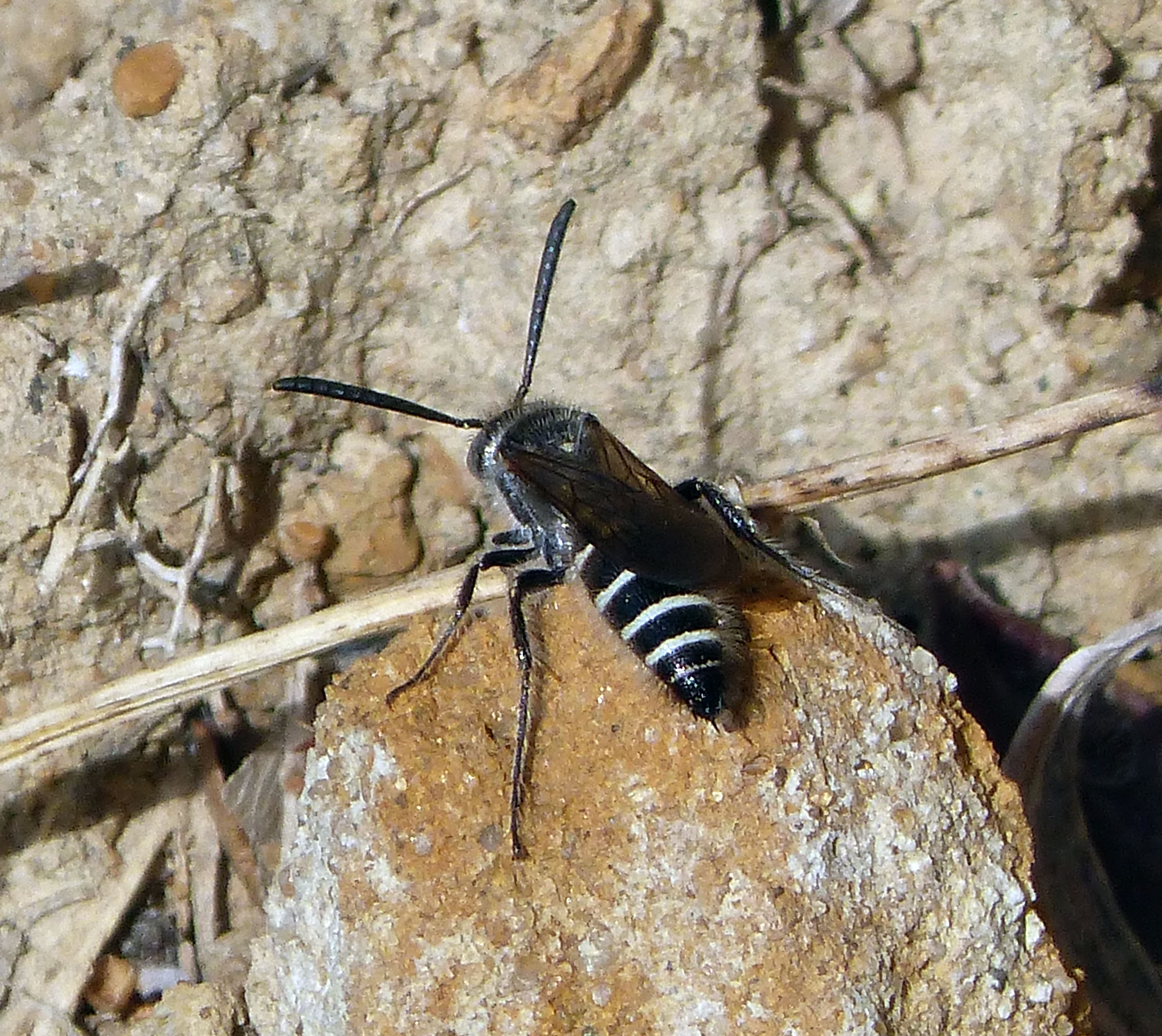
Colpa quinquecincta occidentalis male

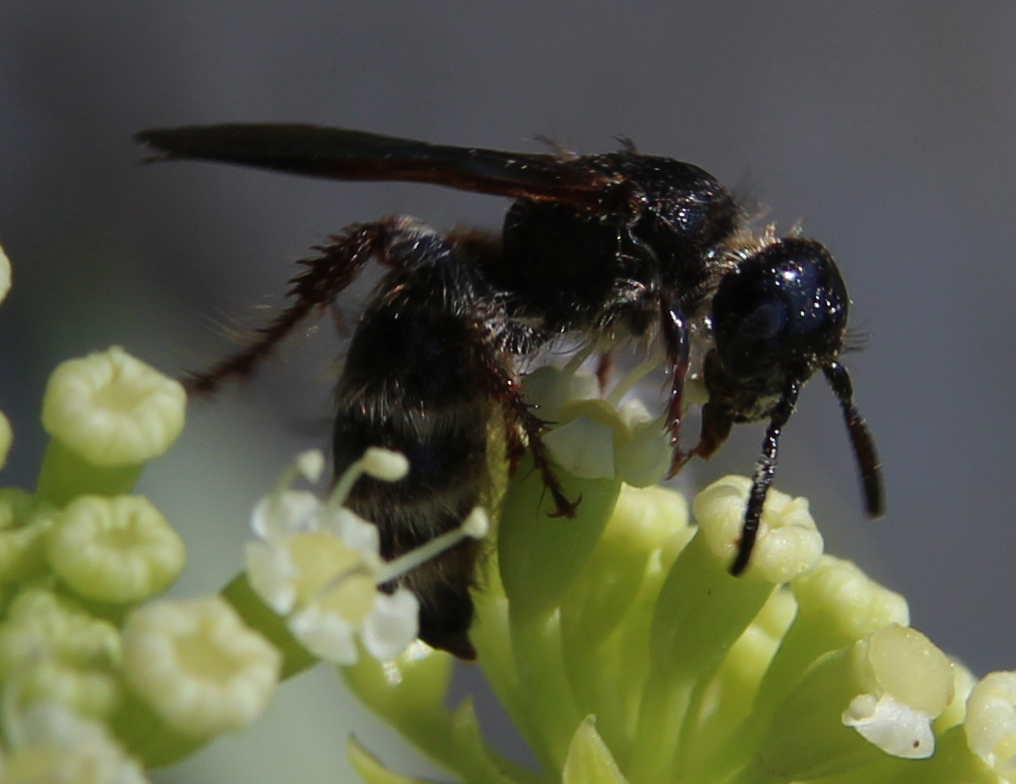
Colpa quinquecincta quinquecincta female

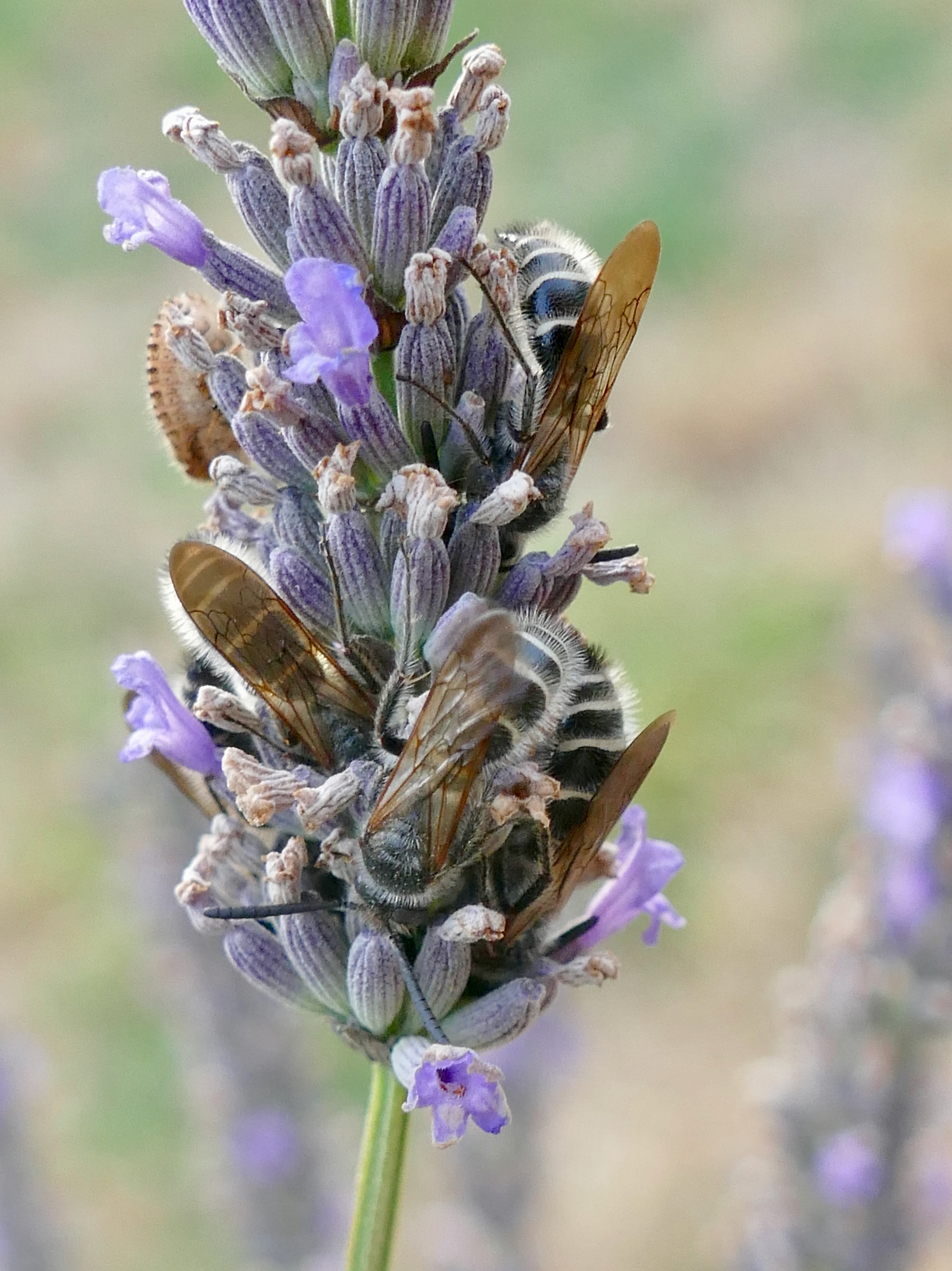
Colpa quinquecincta quinquecincta males

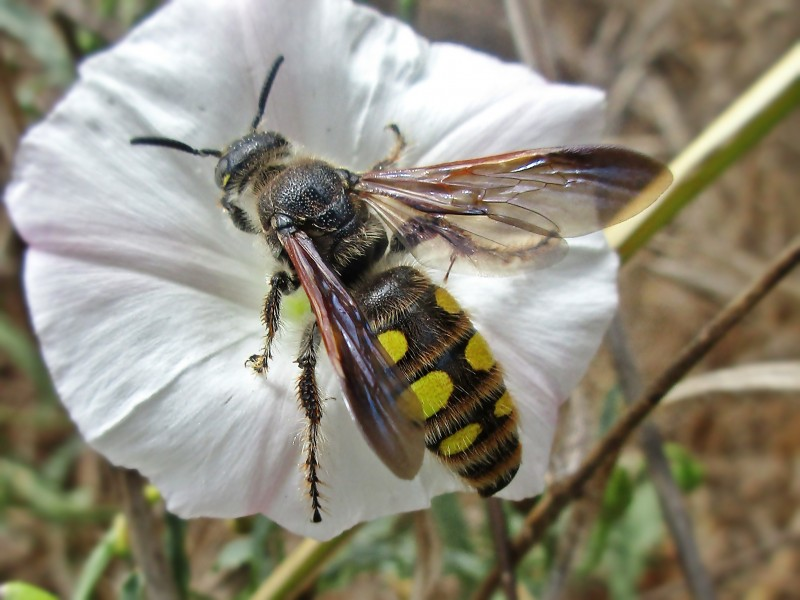
Colpa sexmaculata female

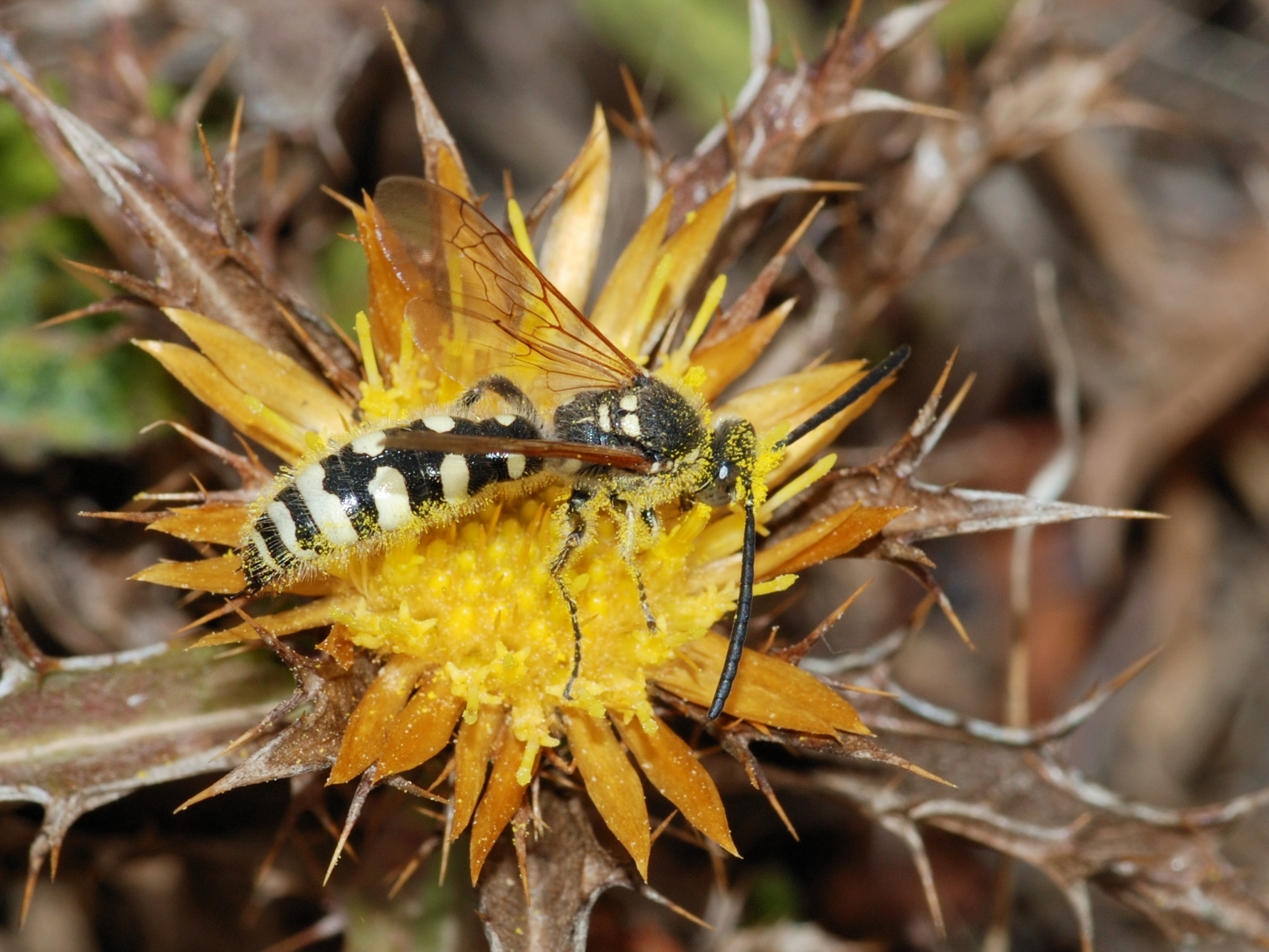
Colpa sexmaculata male
