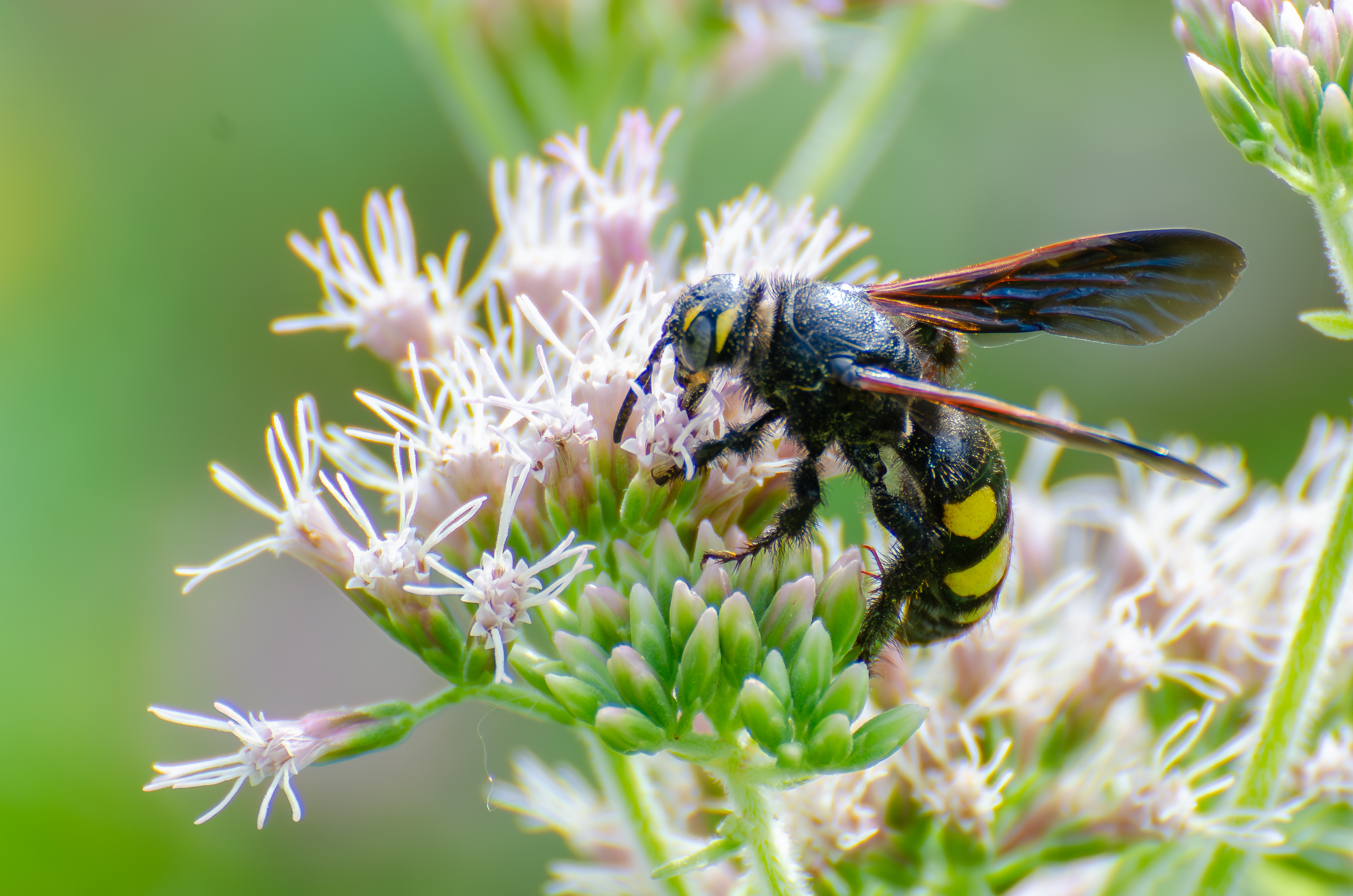

Scientific classification
- Kingdom: Animalia
- Phylum: Arthropoda
- Clade: Pancrustacea
- Class: Insecta
- Order: Hymenoptera
- Family: Scoliidae
- Subfamily: Scoliinae
- Tribe: Trielidini
- Genus: Colpa
- Subgenus: Colpa (Colpa)
- Species: C. sexmaculata

Binomial name
- Colpa sexmaculata Fabricius, 1781

Synonyms
- Scolia interrupta Fabricius, 1781; Scolia sareptana Eversmann, 1849; Scolia sexmaculata Fabricius, 1781

= Colpa sexmaculata =

Species of wasp

Colpa sexmaculata is a species of scoliid wasp, of the genus Colpa. The species occurs in Europe.

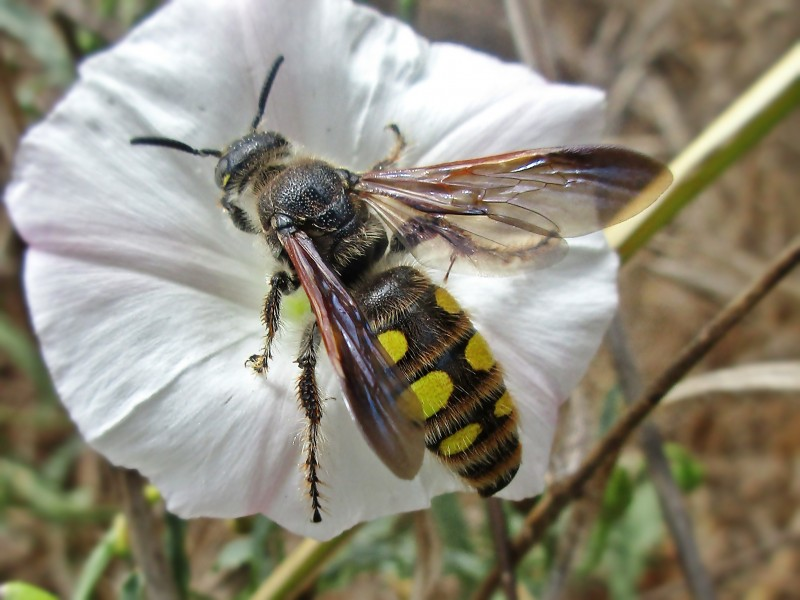
Colpa sexmaculata female

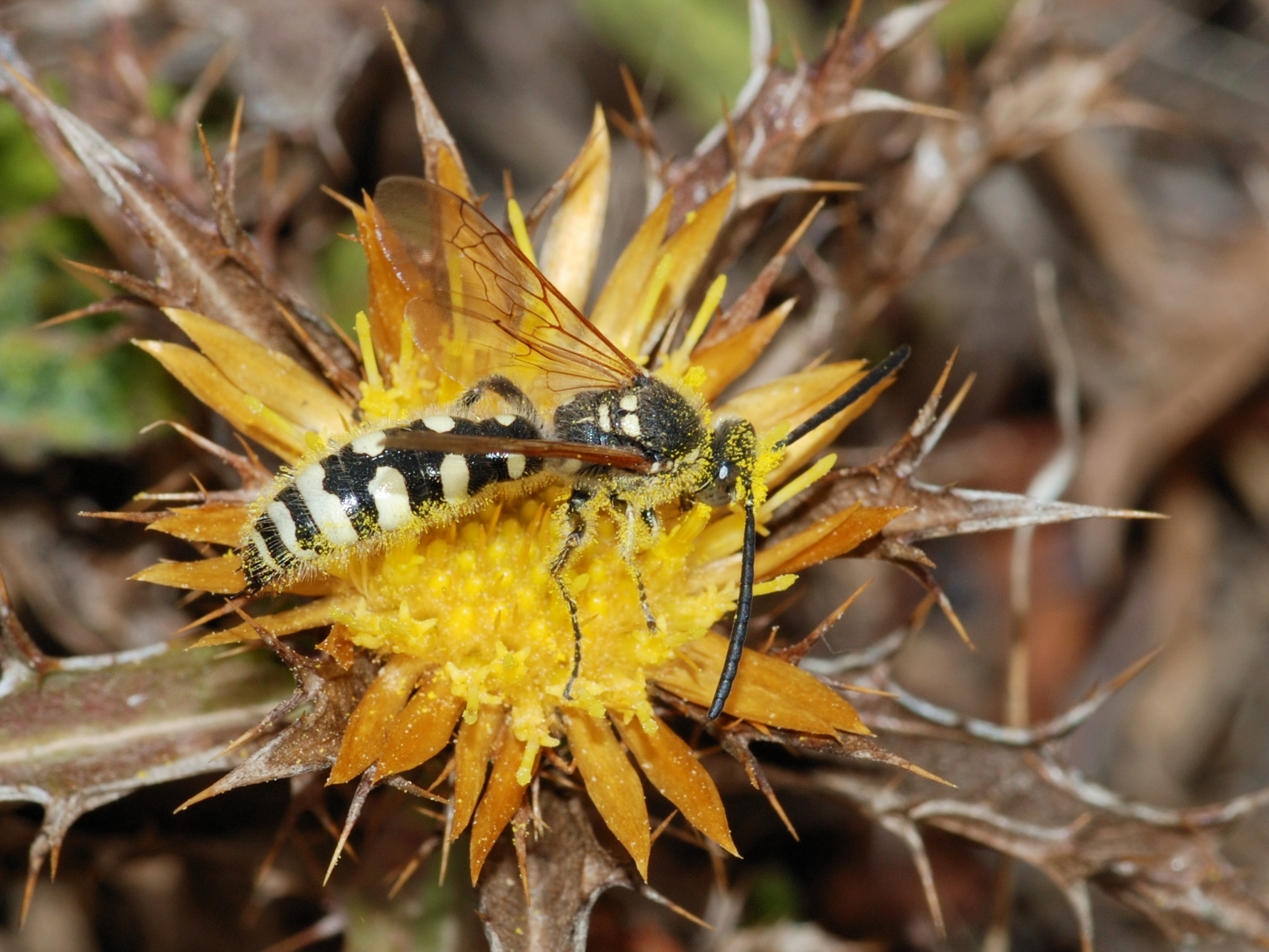
Colpa sexmaculata male
