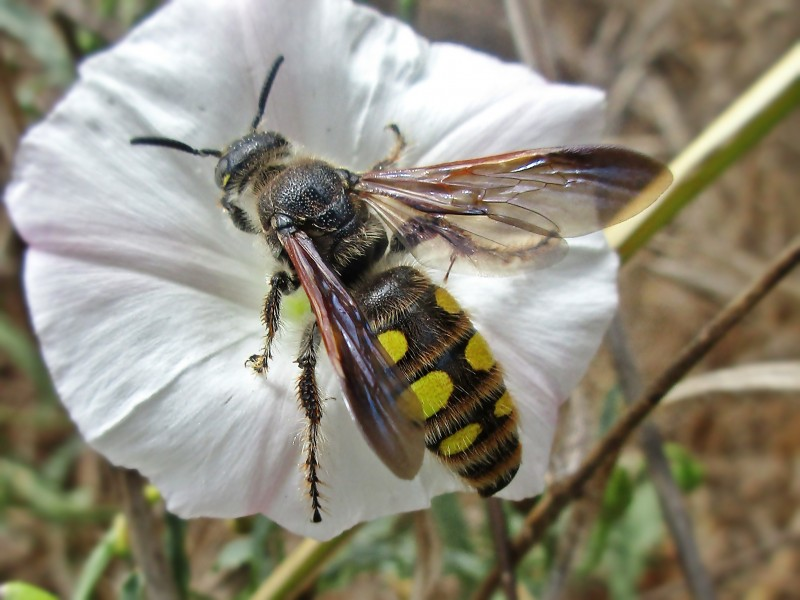
- Colpa sexmaculata in Narbolia, Sardinia, Italy

Scientific classification
- Kingdom: Animalia
- Phylum: Arthropoda
- Clade: Pancrustacea
- Class: Insecta
- Order: Hymenoptera
- Family: Scoliidae
- Subfamily: Scoliinae
- Tribe: Trielidini; Betrem, 1972

Synonyms
- Trielini Betrem, 1965 - nomen nudum; Trielidini Betrem, 1972; Colpinae Argaman, 1996; Colpini Argaman, 1996; Curtaurgini Argaman, 1996; Heterelini Argaman, 1996; Trielidina Betrem, 1972

= Trielidini =

Tribe of wasps

Trielidini is a small tribe of scoliid wasp.

== Description and identification ==
Members of Trielidini are distinguished from other members of Scoliidae by the presence of both two recurrent veins and three submarginal cells.

== Taxonomy and phylogeny ==
This tribe was first published as Trielini by Betrem in 1965 as a tribe of Campsomerinae but was not described and was thus rendered nomen nudum under ICZN. Betrem published the first description under the emended name Trielidini in 1972. This tribe comprised genera with three submarginal cells as distinguished from his Campsomerini with two submarginal cells. The Campsomerinae as treated by Betrem were further distinguished from the Scoliinae by the presence of a second recurrent vein. With the discovery of Proscolia by Rasnitsyn in 1977 and establishment of the subfamily Proscoliinae, Campsomerinae was demoted to tribal status as Campsomerini, and Trielidini was treated as a symonym of Campsomerini. In his 1996 revision of scoliid higher taxonomy, Argaman established a separate subfamily, Colpinae, for Betrem's Trielidini and included tribes: Dasyscoliini, Curtaurgini, Heterelini, Colpini, and Trielidini. Argaman's subfamily and tribes, however, were established without phylogenetic analysis and were simply treated as Campsomerini in Osten's checklist of Scoliidae in 2005. A 2022 revision of North American scoliids by Kimsey et al. found through phylogenetic analysis that Campsomerini was no longer monophyletic with the inclusion of Colpa and instead found the genus was more closely allied with Scoliini, either as a member of Scoliini or as a separate tribe, suggested by the authors as Colpini. The authors opted not to establish the tribe at the time as their work did not include the other allied genera, Dasyscolia and Guigliana. Mitochondrial phylogenetics conducted by Liu, van Achterberg, and Chen in 2024 validated the suspicions of Kimsey et al. and reinstated Trielidini for the genera Colpa and Guigliana, without including Dasyscolia. They used the name Trielidini instead of Colpini to follow ICZN guidelines.

== Genera ==
There are two genera in the tribe Trielidini:

- Colpa Dufour, 1841
- Guigliana Betrem, 1967
