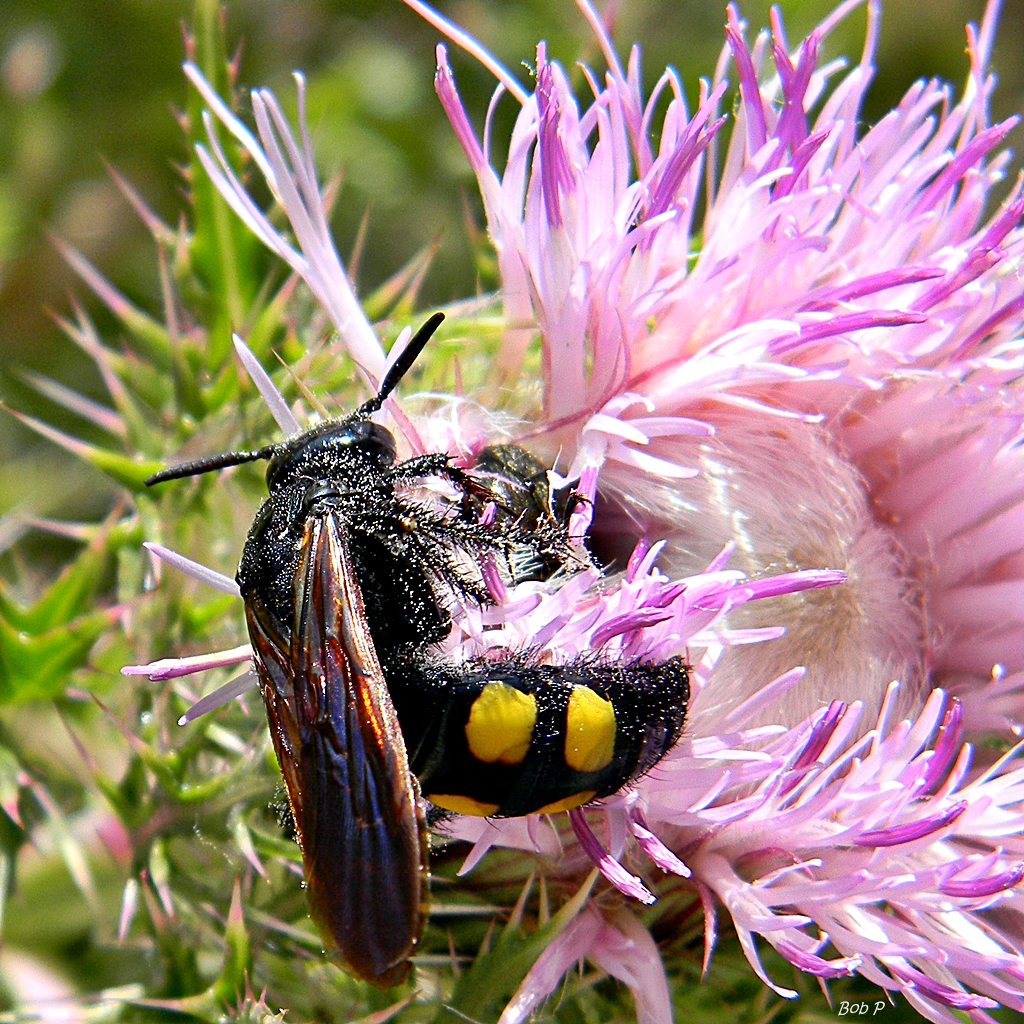
- Pygodasis quadrimaculata female

Scientific classification
- Kingdom: Animalia
- Phylum: Arthropoda
- Clade: Pancrustacea
- Class: Insecta
- Order: Hymenoptera
- Family: Scoliidae
- Subfamily: Campsomerinae
- Genus: Pygodasis; Bradley, 1957

= Pygodasis =

Genus of wasps

Pygodasis is a New World genus of wasps in the family Scoliidae (scoliid wasps), formerly treated as a subgenus within Campsomeris.

== Description and identification ==
Pygodasis are large wasps with an entirely black head, thorax, and tibial spurs. The abdomen is black, often with either yellow to orange spots or bands on the second and third tergites. The setae are usually black but in some species may be white or a mix of black and white. The wings may be hyaline, yellowish, or violaceous depending on the species.

== Distribution ==
Species of this genus occur from the United States south to Argentina.

== Species ==
Species within this genus include:

- Pygodasis bistrimaculata (Lepeletier, 1845)
- Pygodasis cineraria (Sichel, 1864)
- Pygodasis columbiensis (Bradley, 1945)
- Pygodasis cristata (Bradley, 1945)
- Pygodasis ephippium (Say, 1837) – saddleback scoliid wasp
  - Pygodasis ephippium ephippium (Say, 1837)
  - Pygodasis ephippium wagneriana (de Saussure, 1864)
- Pygodasis hyalina (de Saussure, 1864)
- Pygodasis ianthina (Bradley, 1945)
- Pygodasis lucasi (de Saussure, 1858)
- Pygodasis quadrimaculata (Fabricus, 1775) – large four-spotted scoliid wasp
- Pygodasis spegazzini (Bréthes, 1910)
- Pygodasis terrestris (de Saussure, 1858)
- Pygodasis veroninae (Schrottky, 1910)
- Pygodasis vespiformis (de Saussure, 1858)
- Pygodasis vittata (Sichel, 1864)
  - Pygodasis vittata vittata (Sichel, 1864)
  - Pygodasis vittata banksi (Bradley, 1945)

== Gallery ==
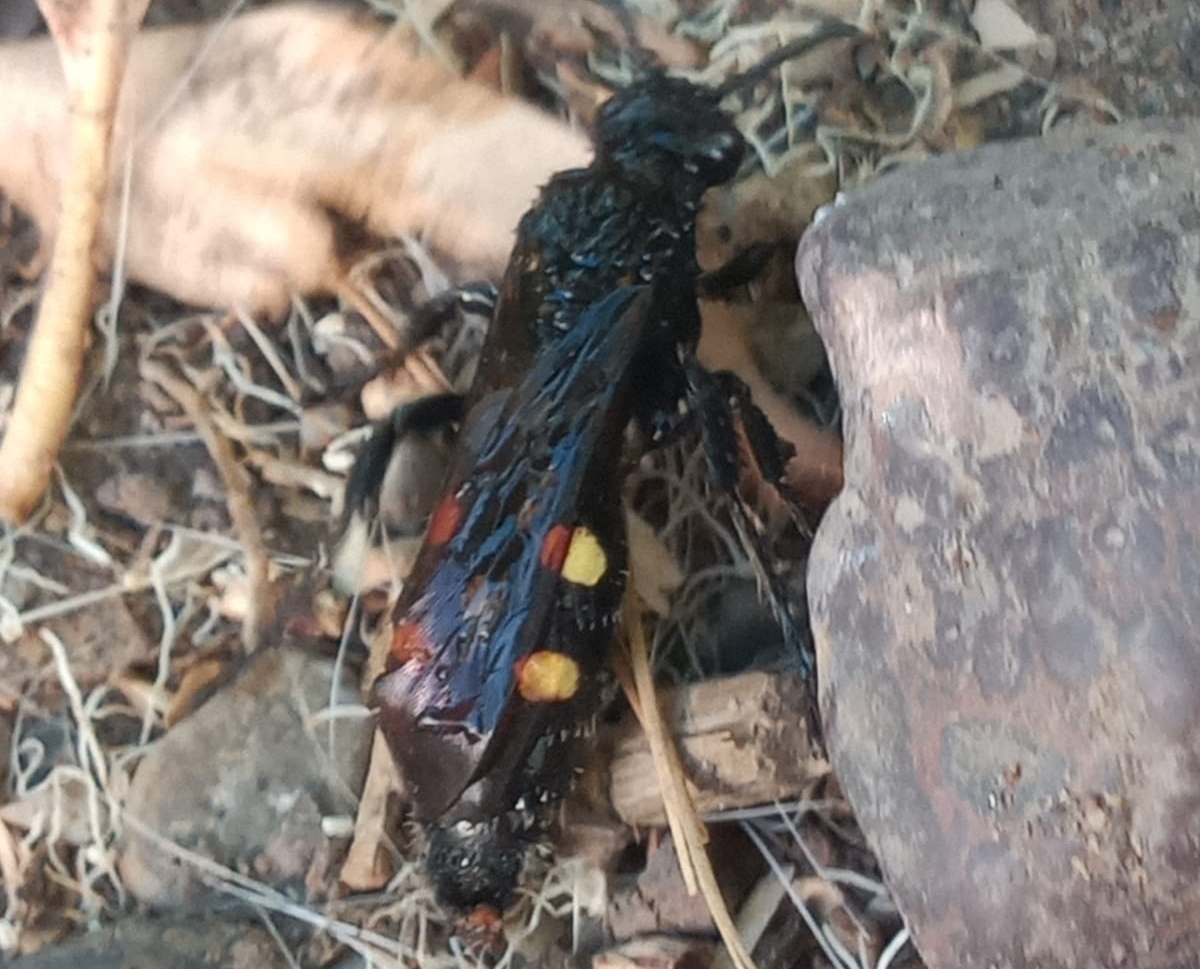
P. bistrimaculata photographed in Argentina.

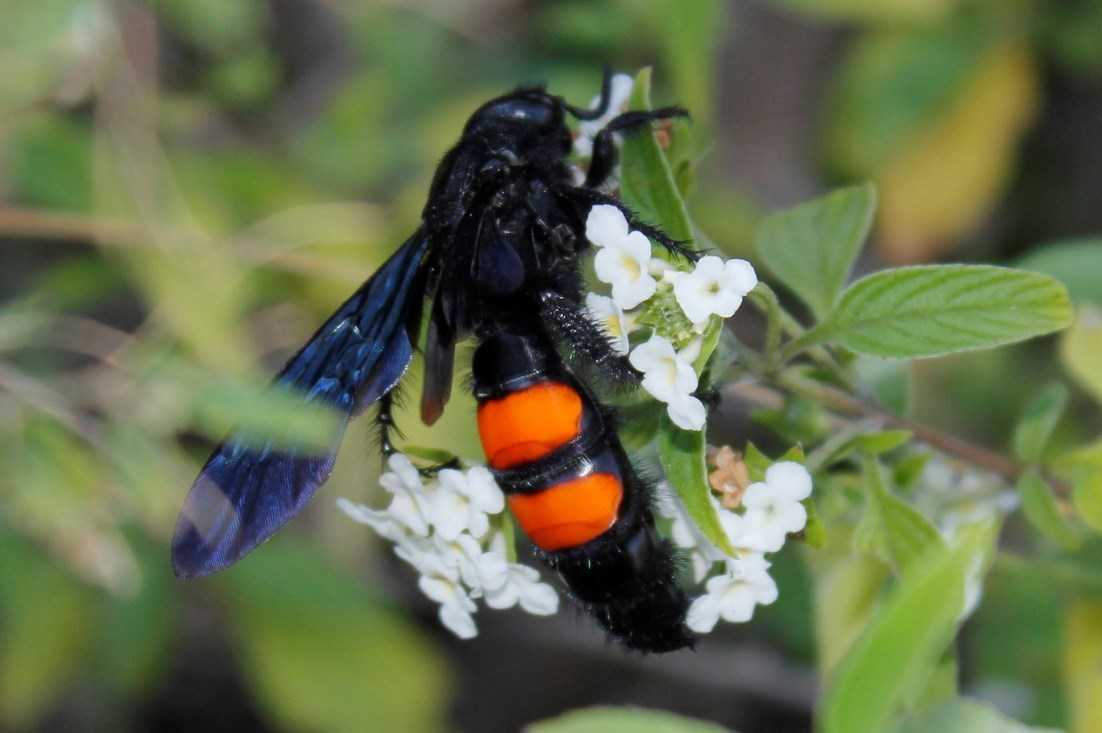
P. ephippium ephippium photographed in Nuevo León, Mexico.

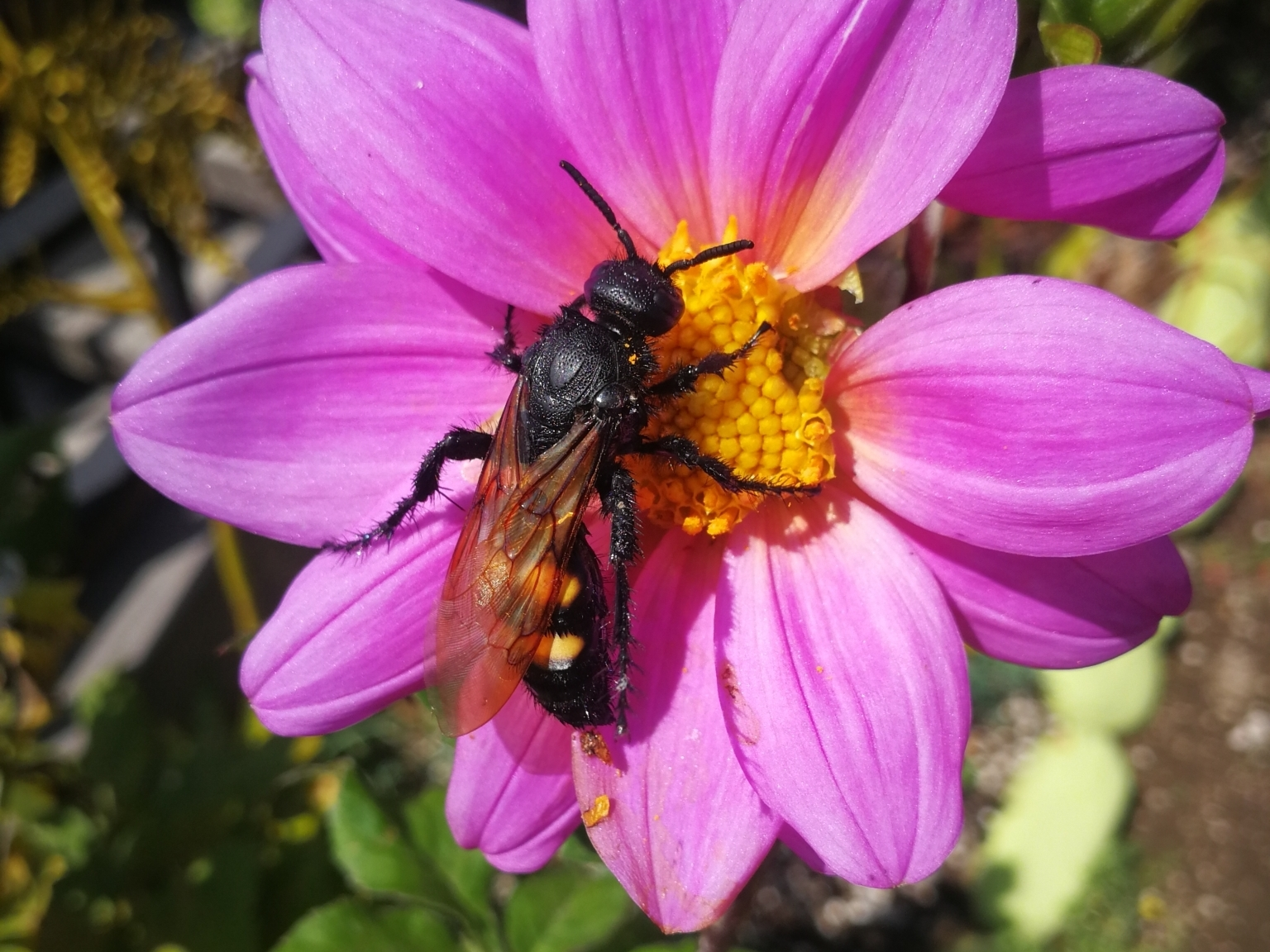
P. ephippium wagneriana photographed in Ecuador.

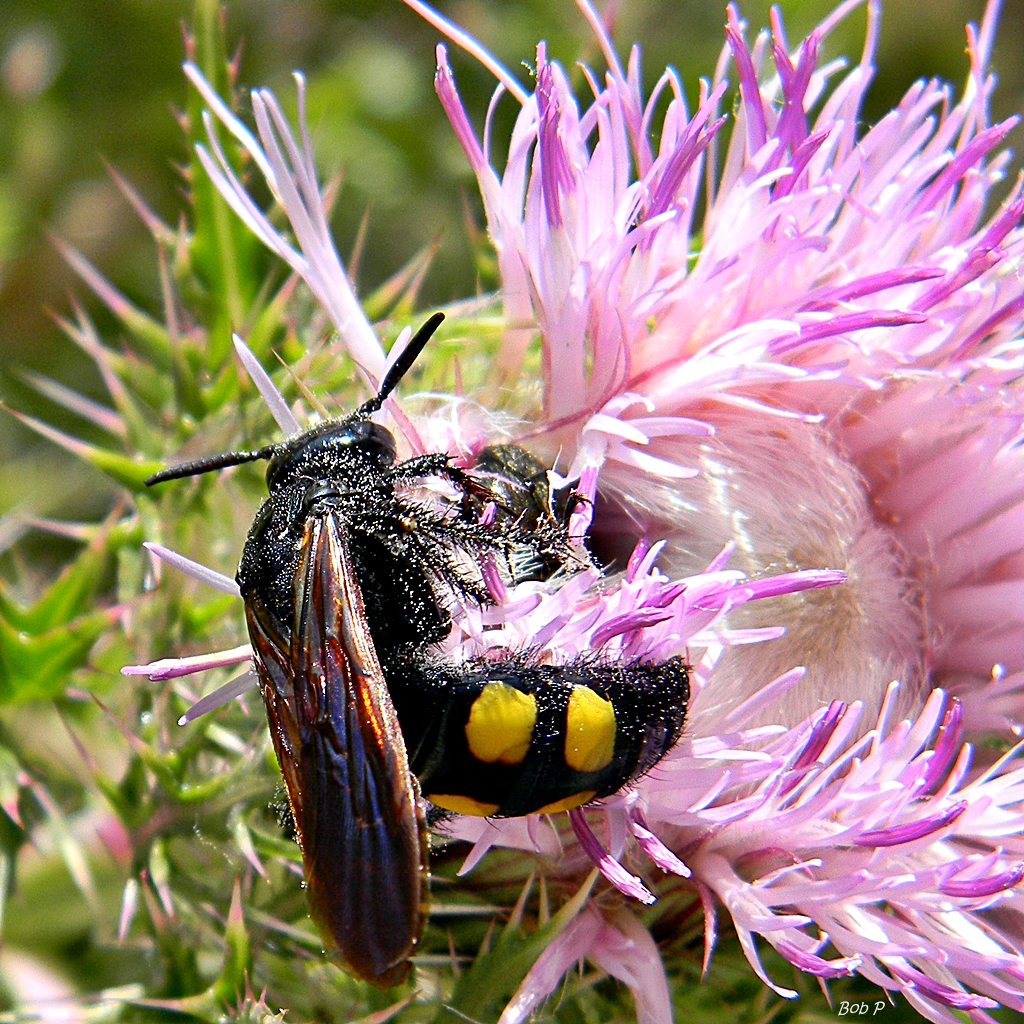
P. quadrimaculata photographed in Florida.

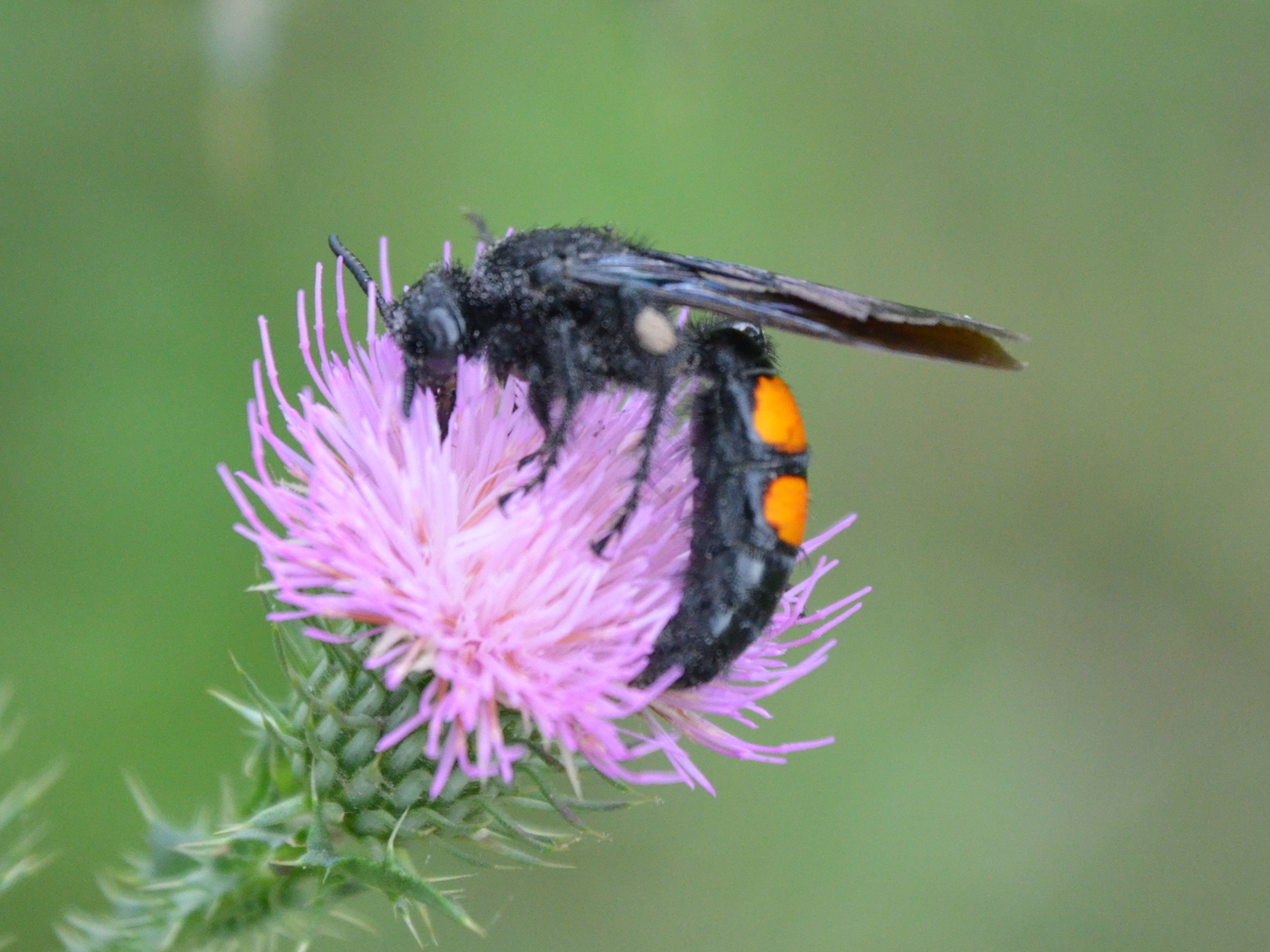
P. terrestris photographed in Argentina.
