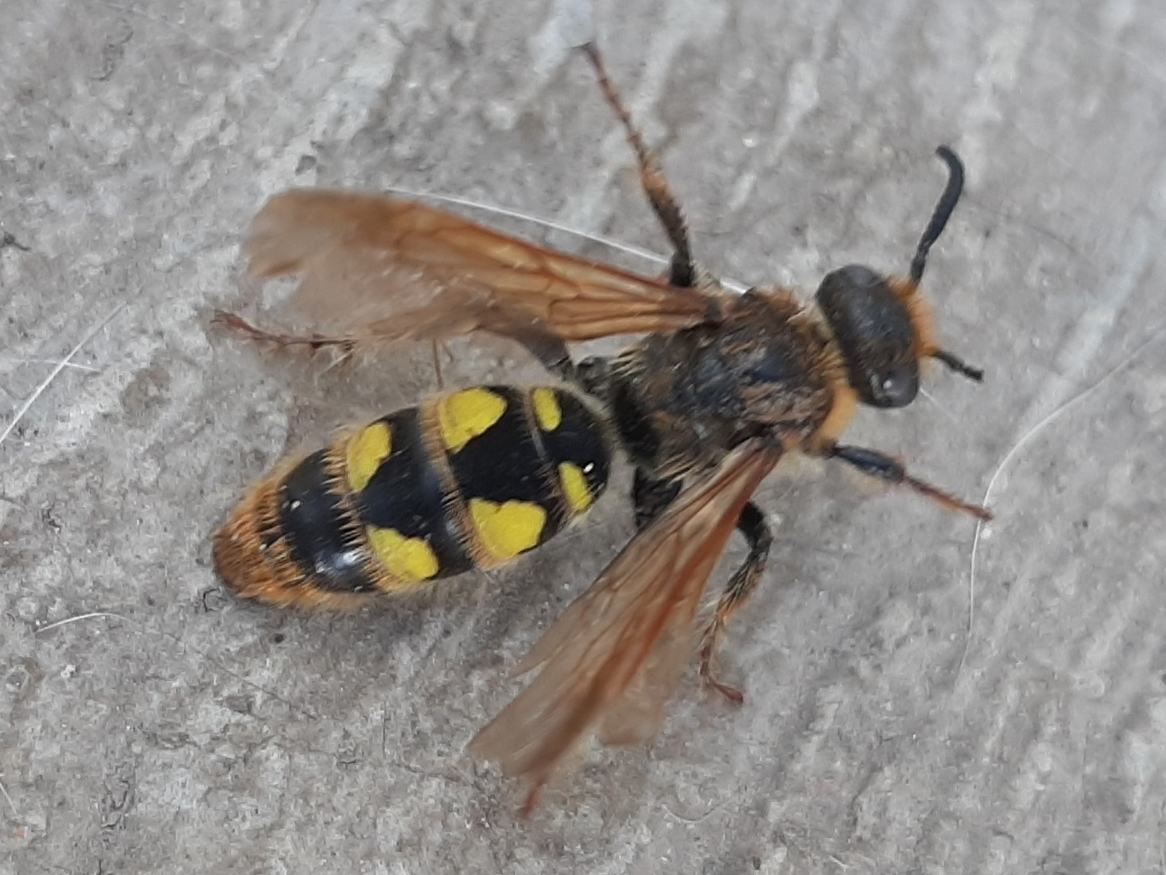
- Xanthocampsomeris limosa

Scientific classification
- Kingdom: Animalia
- Phylum: Arthropoda
- Class: Insecta
- Order: Hymenoptera
- Family: Scoliidae
- Subfamily: Campsomerinae
- Tribe: Campsomerini
- Genus: Xanthocampsomeris; Bradley, 1957

= Xanthocampsomeris =

Genus of wasps

Xanthocampsomeris is a New World genus of the family Scoliidae, also known as the scoliid wasps, formerly treated as a subgenus within Campsomeris.

== Description and identification ==
Xanthocampsomeris are small to medium wasps with dark bodies with the abdomen having yellow markings on 3 or 4 tergites and red at the apex. The legs are reddish with white hind tibial spurs. The wings are subhyaline with yellow venation.

== Distribution ==
Species of this genus are found in the West Indies and from the southern United States south to Colombia.

== Species ==
There are 5 species of Xanthocampsomeris:

- Xanthocampsomeris completa (Rohwer, 1927)
  - Xanthocampsomeris completa completa (Rohwer, 1927)
  - Xanthocampsomeris completa yucatanensis (Bradley, 1964 )
- Xanthocampsomeris fulvohirta (Cresson, 1865)
- Xanthocampsomeris hesterae (Rohwer, 1927)
- Xanthocampsomeris limosa (Burmeister, 1853)
- Xanthocampsomeris tricincta (Fabricius, 1775)

== Gallery ==
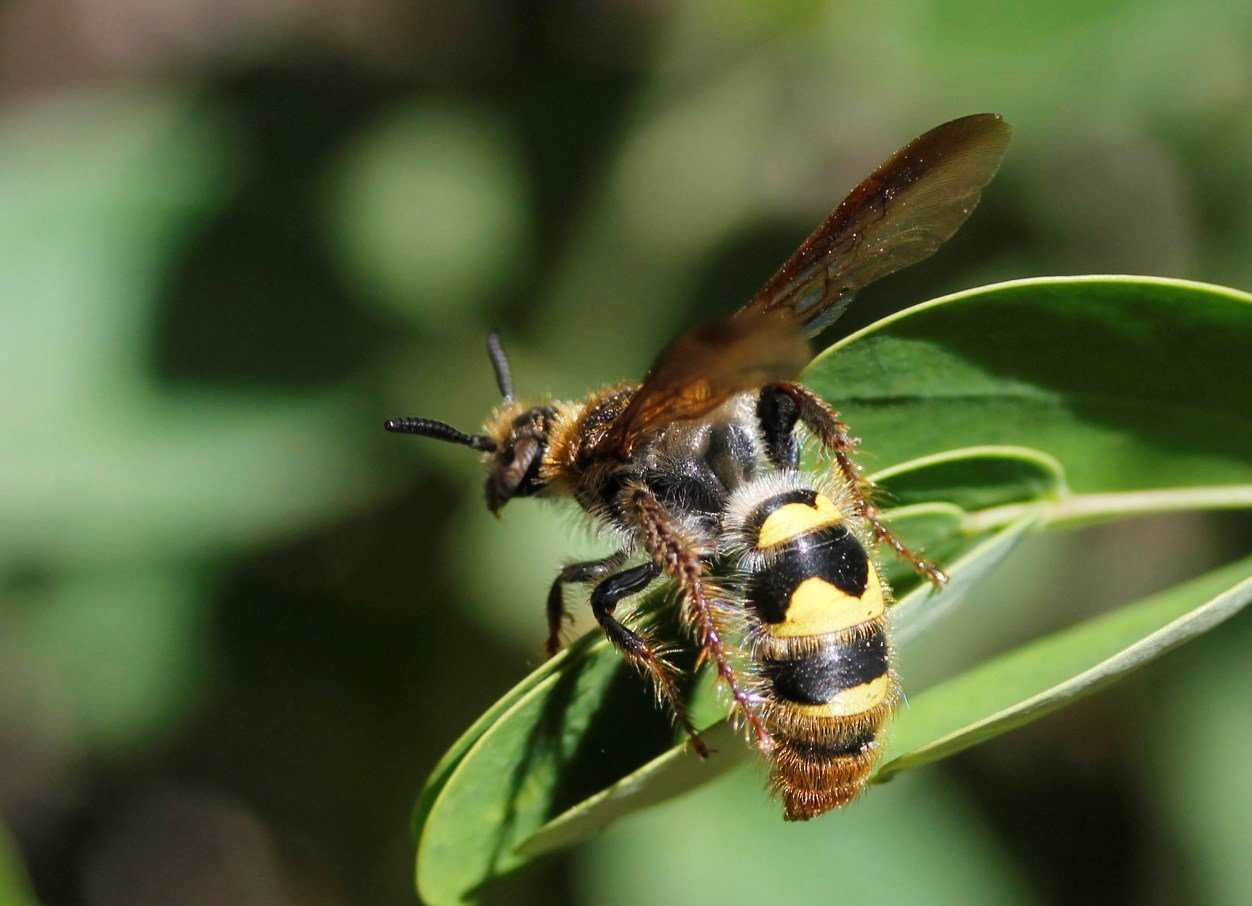
X. completa completa female photographed in Nuevo León, Mexico.

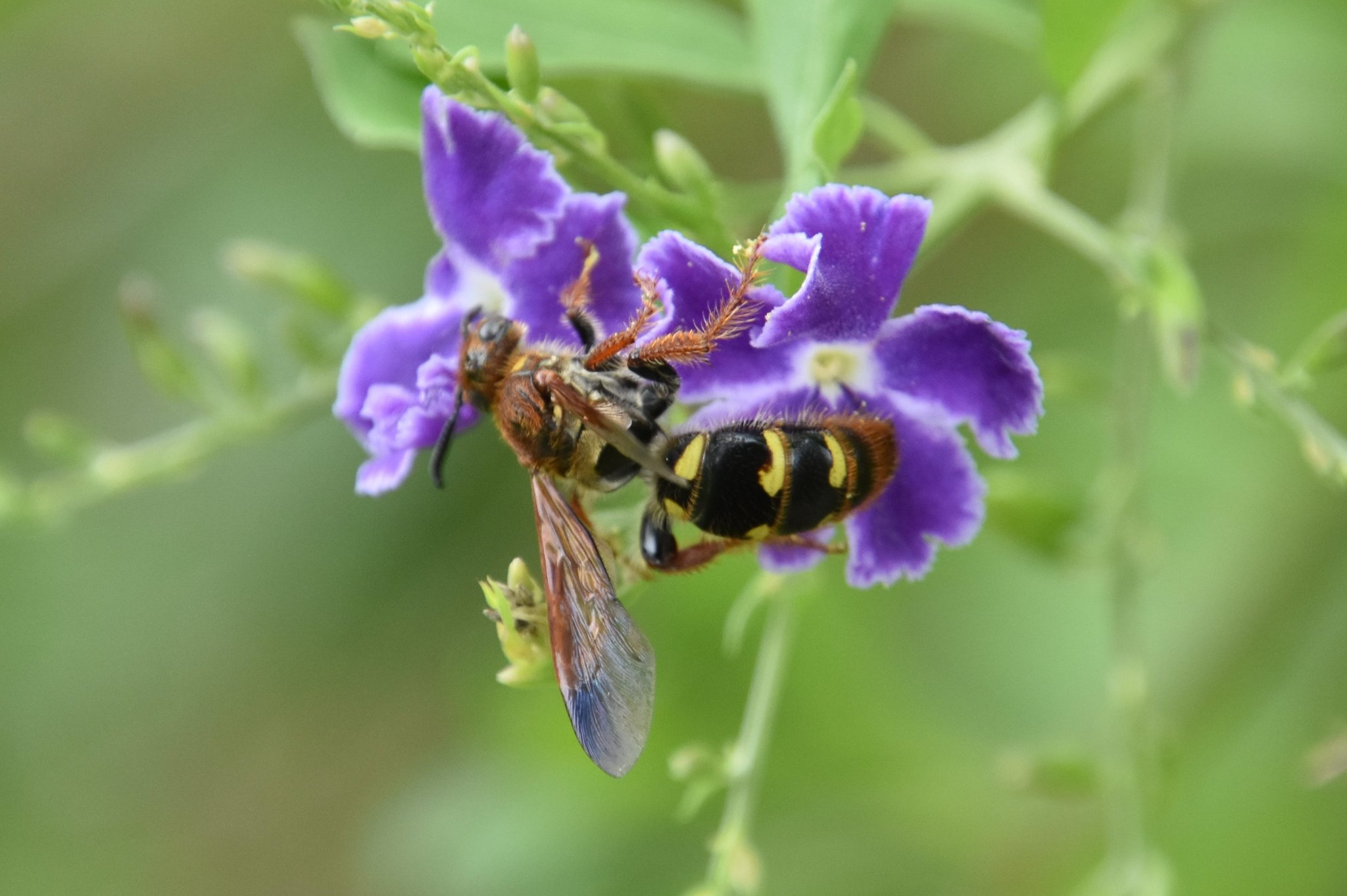
X. fulvohirta female photographed in Florida.

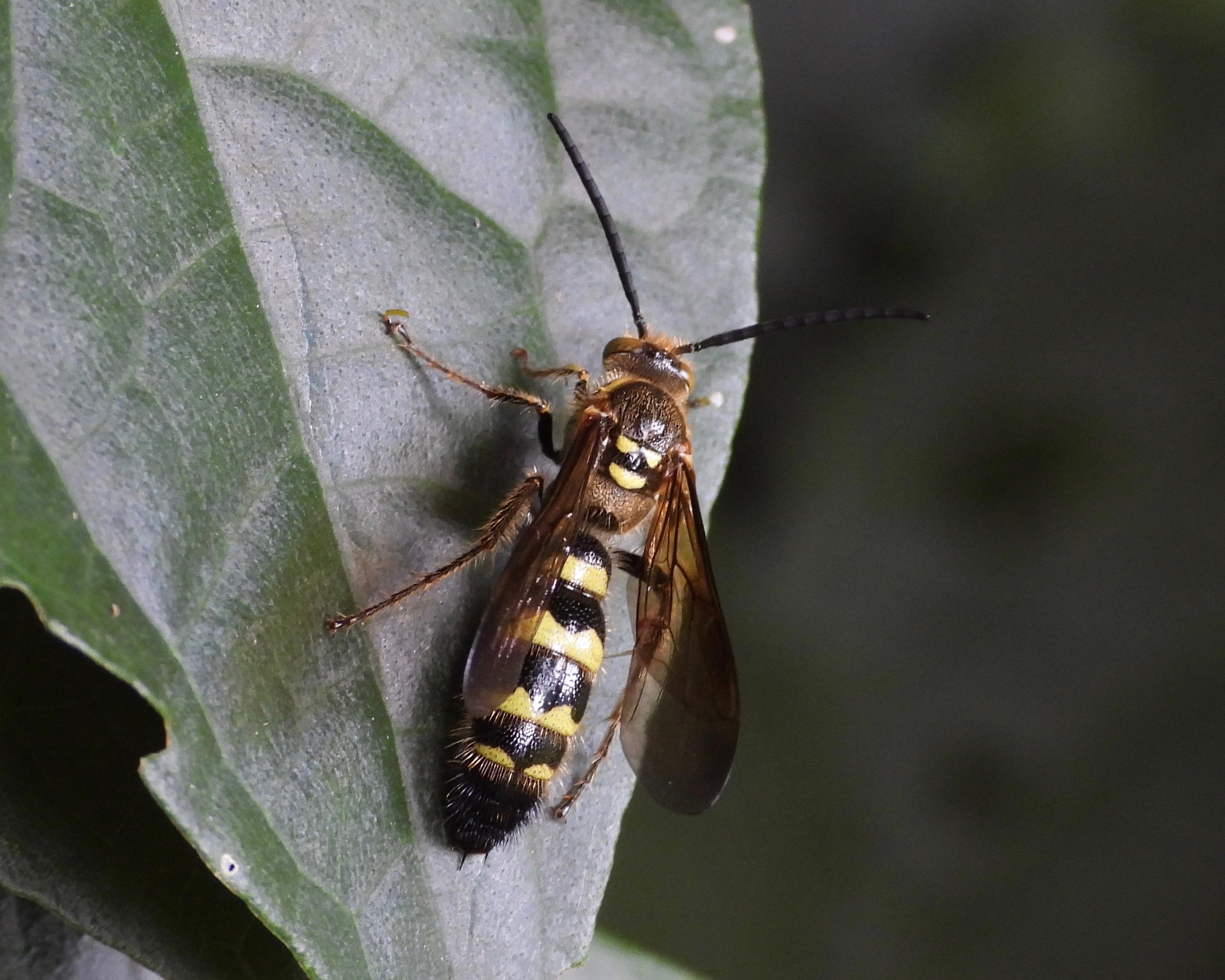
X. hesterae male photographed in Guatemala.

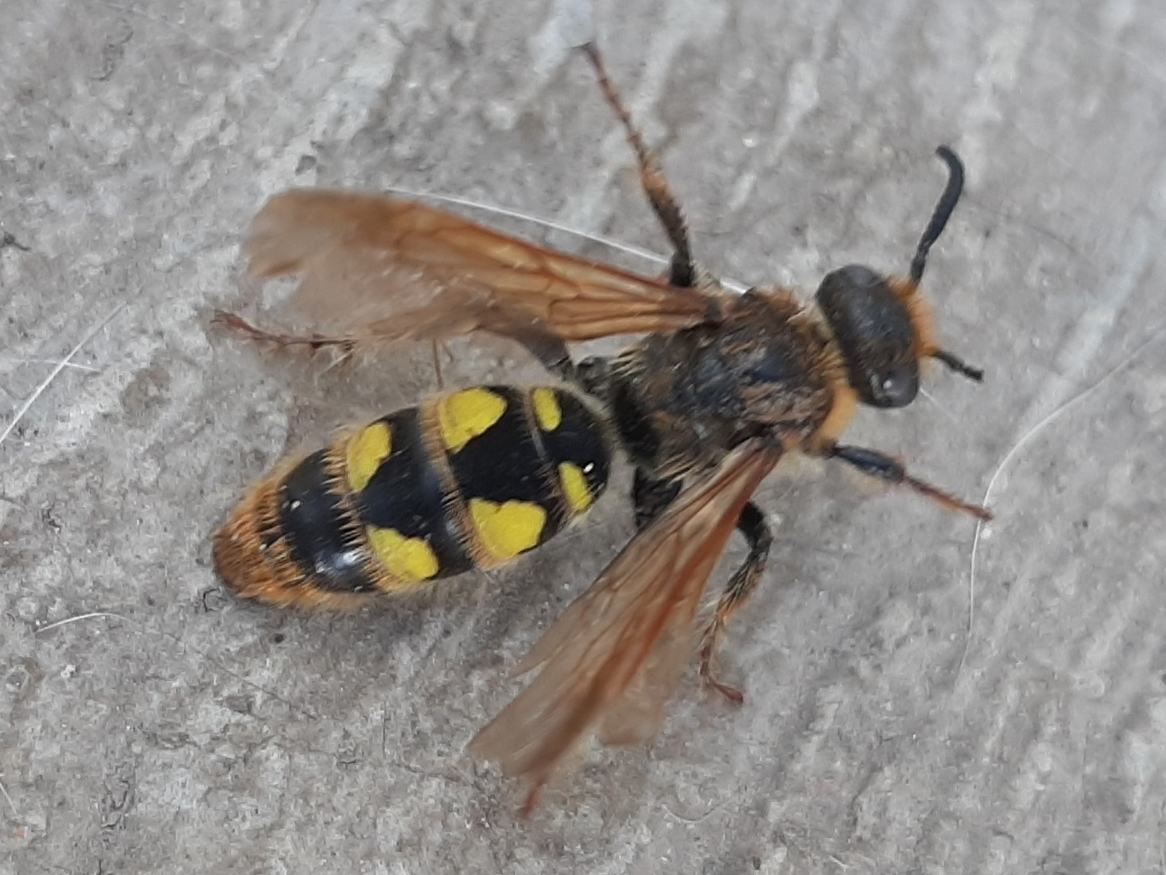
X. limosa female photographed in Mexico City, Mexico.

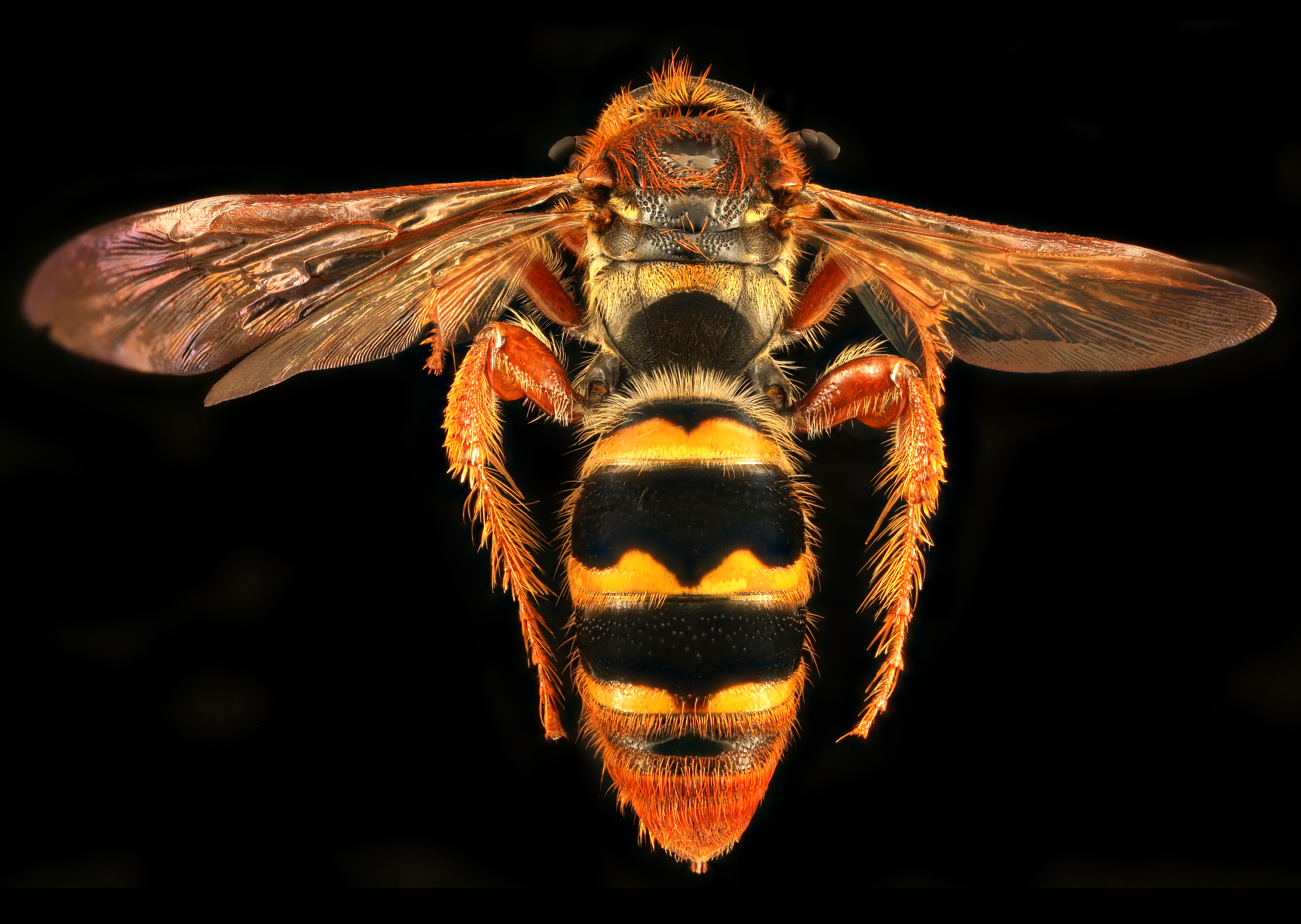
X. tricincta female collected in the Dominican Republic
