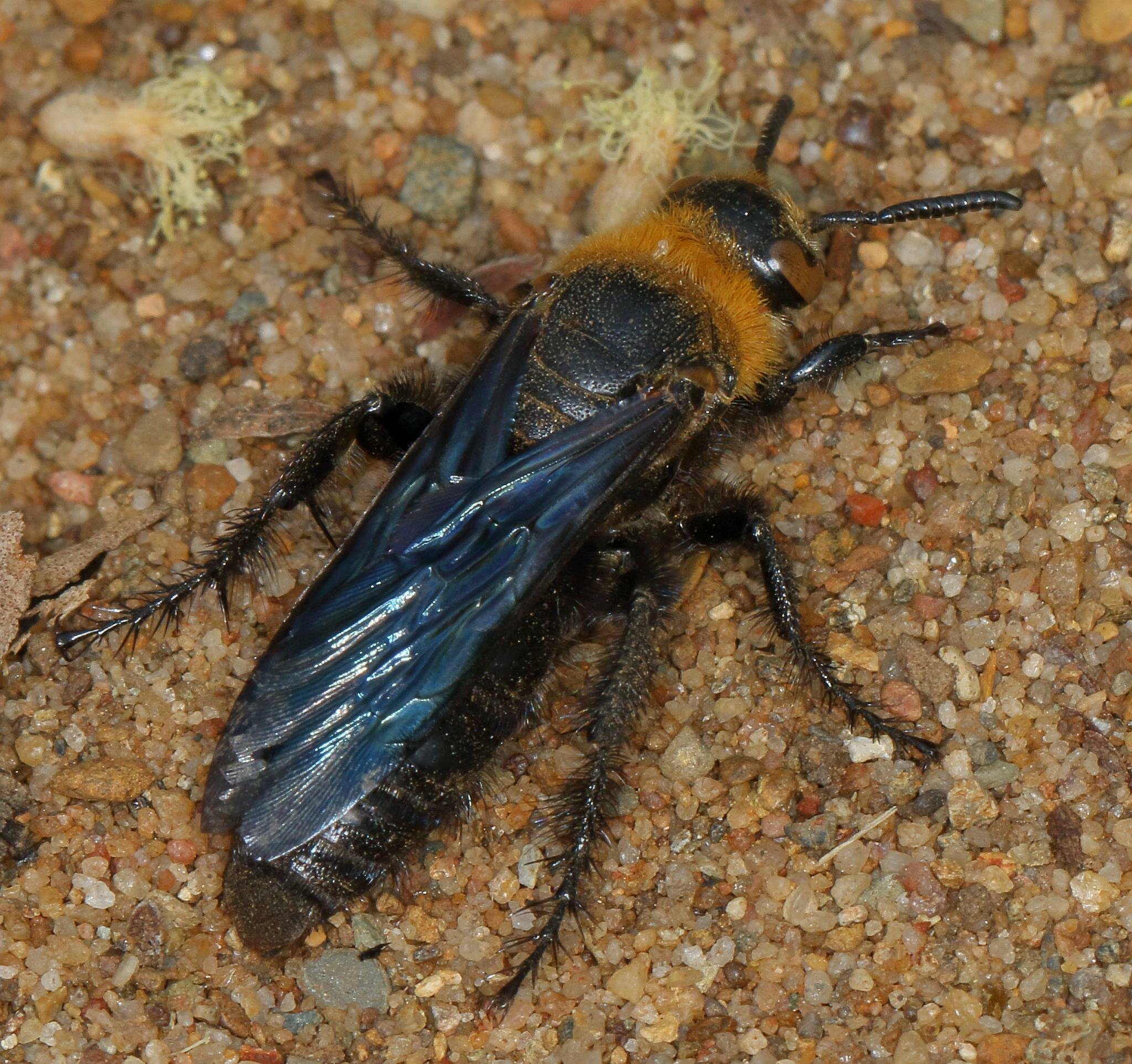
- Campsomeriella caelebs, South Africa

Scientific classification
- Kingdom: Animalia
- Phylum: Arthropoda
- Class: Insecta
- Order: Hymenoptera
- Family: Scoliidae
- Tribe: Campsomerini
- Genus: Campsomeriella
- Species: C. caelebs

Binomial name
- Campsomeriella caelebs (Sichel, 1864)

= Campsomeriella caelebs =

Species of wasps

Campsomeriella caelebs is a species of scoliid wasp in the family Scoliidae, found in Africa and the Palearctic.
