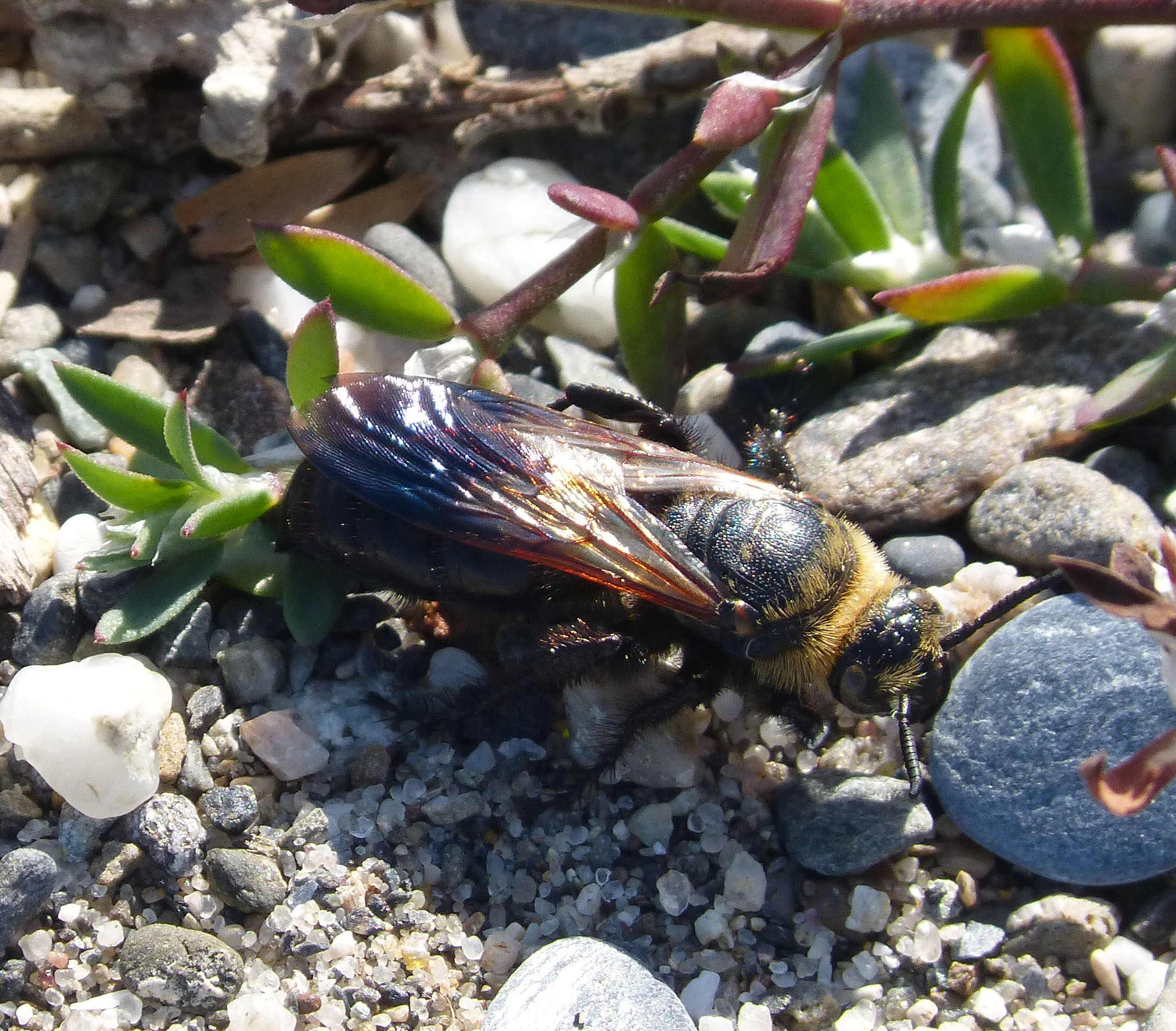
- Campsomeriella thoracica

Scientific classification
- Kingdom: Animalia
- Phylum: Arthropoda
- Class: Insecta
- Order: Hymenoptera
- Family: Scoliidae
- Tribe: Campsomerini
- Genus: Campsomeriella (Betrem, 1941)

Type species
- Campsomeriella annulata (Fabricius, 1793)

= Campsomeriella =

Genus of wasps

Campsomeriella is a genus of the family Scoliidae, also known as the scoliid wasps. They are generally parasites of beetle larvae, most often of Scarabaeidae.

== Species List ==
- Campsomeriella agilis (Smith, 1859)
- Campsomeriella annulata (Fabricius, 1793)
  - Campsomeriella annulata sakaguchii (Uchida, 1933)
- Campsomeriella burmeisteri (Betrem, 1928)
- Campsomeriella caelebs (Sichel, 1864)
- Campsomeriella cameroni (Betrem, 1928)
- Campsomeriella collaris (Fabricius, 1775)
  - Campsomeriella collaris insularis (Gupta & Jonathan, 2003)
  - Campsomeriella collaris quadrifasciata (Fabricius, 1798)
- Campsomeriella cultrata (Kirby, 1894)
- Campsomeriella dimidiatipennis (Saussure, 1855)
- Campsomeriella fax (Bradley, 1936)
- Campsomeriella hirticollis (Fabricius, 1804)
  - Campsomeriella hirticollis bemsteini (Betrem, 1928)
  - Campsomeriella hirticollis diversipennis (Gribodo, 1893)
  - Campsomeriella hirticollis micans (Guerin, 1830)
  - Campsomeriella hirticollis problematica (Betrem, 1928)
- Campsomeriella ilanensis (Tsuneki, 1972)
- Campsomeriella kiogaensis (Betrem, 1972)
- Campsomeriella litoralis (Krombein, 1995)
- Campsomeriella madonensis (Buysson, 1910)
  - Campsomeriella madonensis transvaalensis (Cameron, 1910)
  - Campsomeriella madonensis zambiensis (Betrem, 1972)
- Campsomeriella manokwariensis (Cameron, 1906)
  - Campsomeriella manokwariensis kraussi (Krombein, 1973)
  - Campsomeriella manokwariensis lanhami (Krombein, 1963)
  - Campsomeriella manokwariensis manni (Krombein, 1963)
- Campsomeriella ornaticollis (Cameron, 1909)
- Campsomeriella pseudocollaris (Betrem, 1972)
- Campsomeriella rajasthanica (Gupta & Jonathan, 2003)
- Campsomeriella rubromarginata (Betrem, 1972)
- Campsomeriella sauteri (Beirem, 1928)
  - Campsomeriella sauteri berlandi (Beirem, 1928)
- Campsomeriella thoracica (Fabricius, 1787)
  - Campsomeriella thoracica senilis (Fabricius, 1793)
- Campsomeriella torquata (Betrem & Bradley, 1972)
- Campsomeriella wetterensis (Betrem, 1928)
