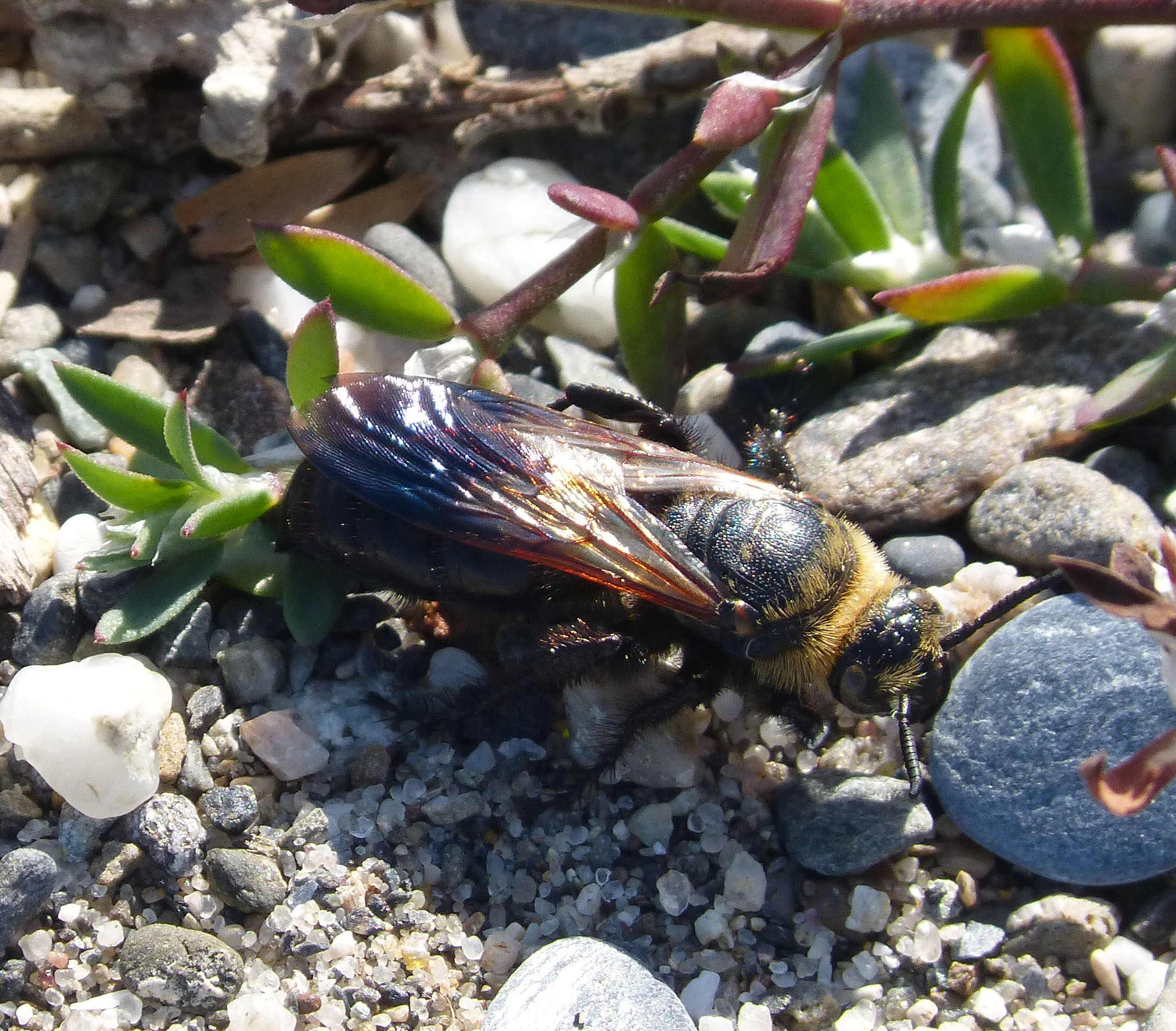
- Female of a Campsomeriella thoracica

Scientific classification
- Domain: Eukaryota
- Kingdom: Animalia
- Phylum: Arthropoda
- Class: Insecta
- Order: Hymenoptera
- Family: Scoliidae
- Genus: Campsomeriella
- Species: C. thoracica

Binomial name
- Campsomeriella thoracica (Fabricius, 1787)

= Campsomeriella thoracica =

Species of wasp

Campsomeriella thoracica is a species of scarab parasitoid wasp that has been recorded in the Middle East, Mediterranean, and Sub-Saharan Africa.

== Description ==
=== Female ===
This species exhibits significant Sexual dimorphism. The female's body is a reflective black colour, with two smoky, iridescent pairs of wings. She is between 17 and 22 mm long. She has six legs, and the hind legs are remarkably large, with tough bristles resembling spikes pointing at a downwards angle from the body. The thorax is distinguishable, as it is covered in soft, ginger hair which leads to the common mistaken identity of a bee. On her head is a pair of orange and large compound eyes and three small ocelli, only detecting change in light. She possesses a pair of large, powerful but relatively blunt sickle-shaped mandibles. The compound eyes are well-developed giving the wasp a large field of view. Her antennas are short, and relatively thick. The stinger is 1 mm long.

=== Male ===
The Male is very bee-like. His body has an overall grey colour, as opposed to the female's jet-black. His abdomen's patterning consists of alternating reddish-orange and black stripes, typical of many wasps, while western populations lack the orange colouration. Coated with a layer of soft, grey hair, the male's legs are not as muscular as the female's, being thin and lacking the spike-like bristles of the opposite sex. He is only about half her size, and his mandibles are much smaller than hers. He has similarly sized compound eyes, but they are grey instead of orange. On his pygidia are three bristles, and he does not have a stinger. Another key difference is that the Male has much longer antennae than the female, about a third as long as he is. He has two pairs of wings which are hyaline.

== Behaviour ==
Being a solitary wasp species, C. thoracica does not establish hives. The males are gregarious and can be found in small groups, gravitating towards bushes and flowers seeking nectar and can be found around bees. They also patrol the areas, looking for potential females to mate with, using their strong vision to recognise them. Males might engage in minor skirmishes to mate as their population is generally higher than that of the female. The female is solitary and do not gather in small groups like the males do. She scouts the area in search for hosts, particularly scarab beetle larva. She might also create small burrows in order to find her host. This species is harmless to humans. If encountered by humans, the male will fly away or attempt to outmanoeuvre them, while the female will ignore the human, carrying on with her locating of hosts and will fly away to a farther spot if she is approached. She will only sting if mishandled, and is not aggressive. Their sting creates an immediate sharp pain in the area that is stung and the pain subsides after a short while. The sting is not medically significant.

== Life cycle ==
Like other wasps of the family, the female C. thoracica seeks a beetle larvae to attack. She may dig a burrow or encounter the beetle above ground. Using her large mandibles and strong legs, she tackles the grub and with her sharp stinger injects her eggs into the beetle, before flying off. The larva hatches after a few days and is white, segmented and mostly featureless, resembling a fly's larva and tapering at both ends. It remains attached to the beetle larva, and feeds on it as it grows. Eventually, it performs the finishing move by consuming all of the grub's internal organs and kills it, before spinning a cocoon and then emerging as the adult.
