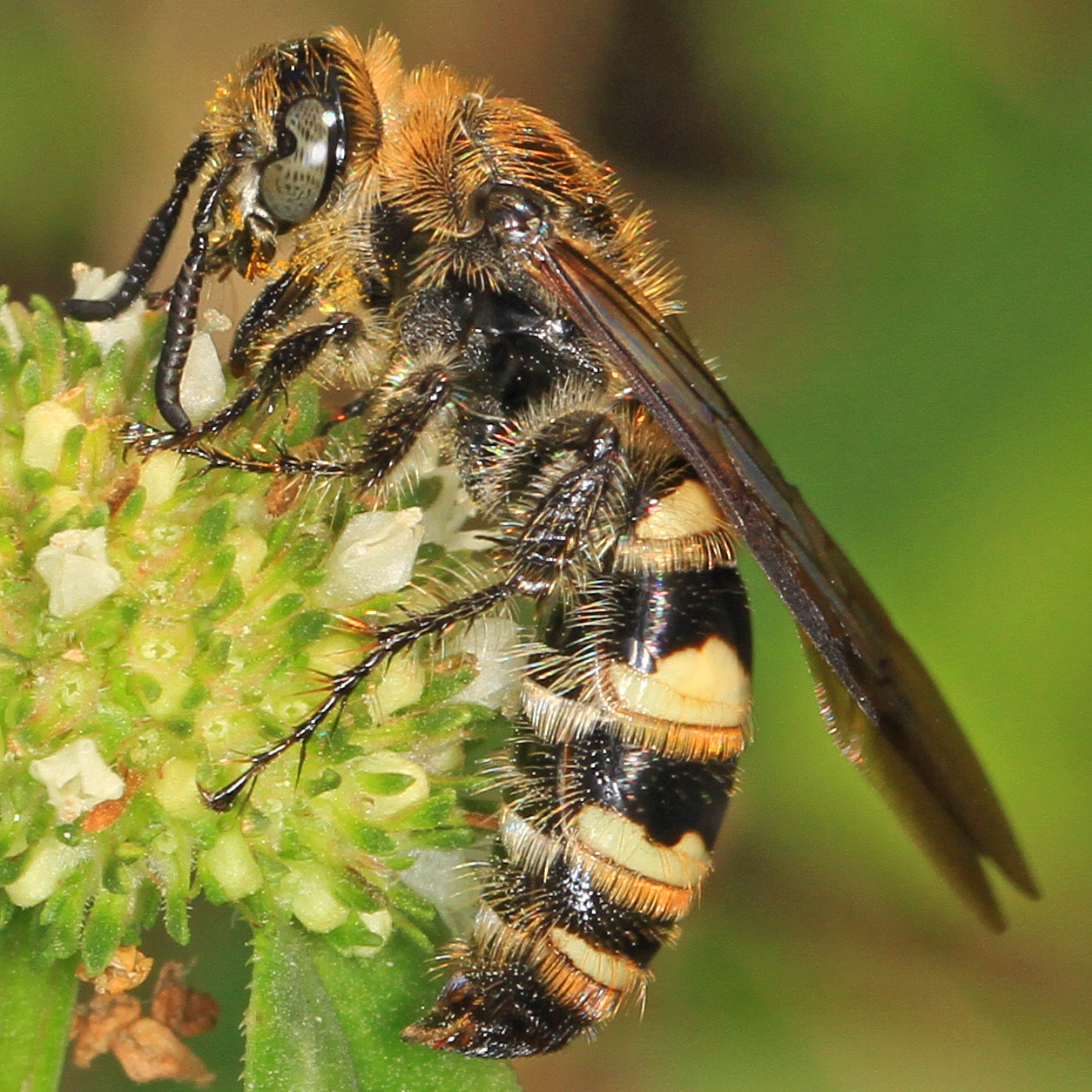
- Dielis plumipes fossulana at Okaloacoochee Slough State Forest, Florida, USA

Scientific classification
- Kingdom: Animalia
- Phylum: Arthropoda
- Clade: Pancrustacea
- Class: Insecta
- Order: Hymenoptera
- Family: Scoliidae
- Subfamily: Campsomerinae
- Tribe: Campsomerini; Betrem, 1972

Synonyms
- Campsomerinae Betrem, 1972; Colpacampsomerini Argaman, 1996; Dasyscoliini Argaman, 1996; Dielidini Argaman, 1996; Dobrobetini Argaman, 1996; Megacampsomerini Argaman, 1996; Pseudotrielidini Argaman, 1996; Tetrascitonini Argaman, 1996; Trisciloini Argaman, 1996; Campsomerina Betrem, 1972

= Campsomerini =

Tribe of wasps

Campsomerini is a cosmopolitan tribe of the family Scoliidae. An older, alternative representation of this group is as a subfamily, Campsomerinae. As with other scoliid wasps, these are solitary parasitoids of scarabaeid beetle larvae that live in soil or leaf litter.

== Taxonomy and phylogeny ==
Campsomerinae was originally described by Betrem in 1972 as a sister group to the Scoliinae comprising the scoliid wasps with two recurrent veins. This subfamily was further divided into the Campsomerini for species with two submarginal cells and Trielidini for species with three submarginal cells. Following the discovery of the genus Proscolia, the Campsomerinae and Scoliinae of Betrem were demoted to tribes, Campsomerini and Scoliini, under a newly defined Scoliinae by Rasnitsyn in 1977 and maintained as such by and Day et al. in 1981. In 1996, Argaman re-elevated the tribes to subfamily status, along with elevating Betrem's Trielidini to a separate subfamily as Colpinae. Argaman further subdivided his Campsomerinae into 8 tribes (Trisciloini, Tetrascitonini, Pseudotrielidini, Dobrobetini, Campsomerini, Colpacampsomerini, Megacampsomerini, and Dielidini) and his Colpinae into 5 tribes (Dasyscoliini, Curtaurgini, Heterelini, Colpini, and Trielidini) but did so without any phylogenetic analysis. Argaman's revisions to higher taxonomy, additionally, were not maintained in Osten's 2005 checklist, and Osten again treated the group as tribe Campsomerini. In a review of the scoliid wasps of North America, Kimsey et al. likewise maintained Campsomerini as a tribe but excluded the genus Colpa to maintain monophyly, with the suggestion that Colpa and its allies more likely either represent a separate tribe as Colpini or a subset of Scoliini. The results of mitochondrial phylogenetics by Liu, van Achterberg, and Chen in 2024 corroborated a separate lineage comprising Colpa and Guigliana, though used the name Trielidini instead of Colpini to follow ICZN guidelines.

== Genera ==
Genera within this tribe include:

- Aelocampsomeris Bradley 1957
- Aureimeris Betrem, 1972
- Australelis Betrem, 1962
- Campsomeriella Betrem, 1941
- Campsomeris Lepeletier, 1838
- Cathimeris Betrem, 1972
- Charimeris Betrem, 1971
- Colpacampsomeris Betrem, 1967
- Dasyscolia Bradley, 1951
- Dielis Saussure & Sichel, 1864
- Extrameris Betrem, 1972
- Laevicampsomeris Betrem, 1933
- Leomeris Betrem, 1972
- Lissocampsomeris Bradley, 1957
- Megacampsomeris Betrem, 1928
- Megameris Betrem, 1967
- Micromeriella Betrem, 1972
- Peltatimeris Betrem, 1972
- Phalerimeris Betrem, 1967
- Pseudotrielis Betrem, 1928
- Pygodasis Bradley, 1957
- Radumeris Betrem, 1962
- Rhabdotomeris Bradley, 1957
- Sericocampsomeris Betrem, 1941
- Sphenocampsomeris Bradley, 1957
- Stygocampsomeris Bradley, 1957
- Tenebromeris Betrem, 1963
- Trisciloa Gribodo, 1893
- Tristimeris Betrem, 1967
- Tubatimeris Betrem, 1972
- Xanthocampsomeris Bradley, 1957

=== Transferred to Trielidini ===
- Colpa Dufour, 1841
- Guigliana Betrem, 1967
