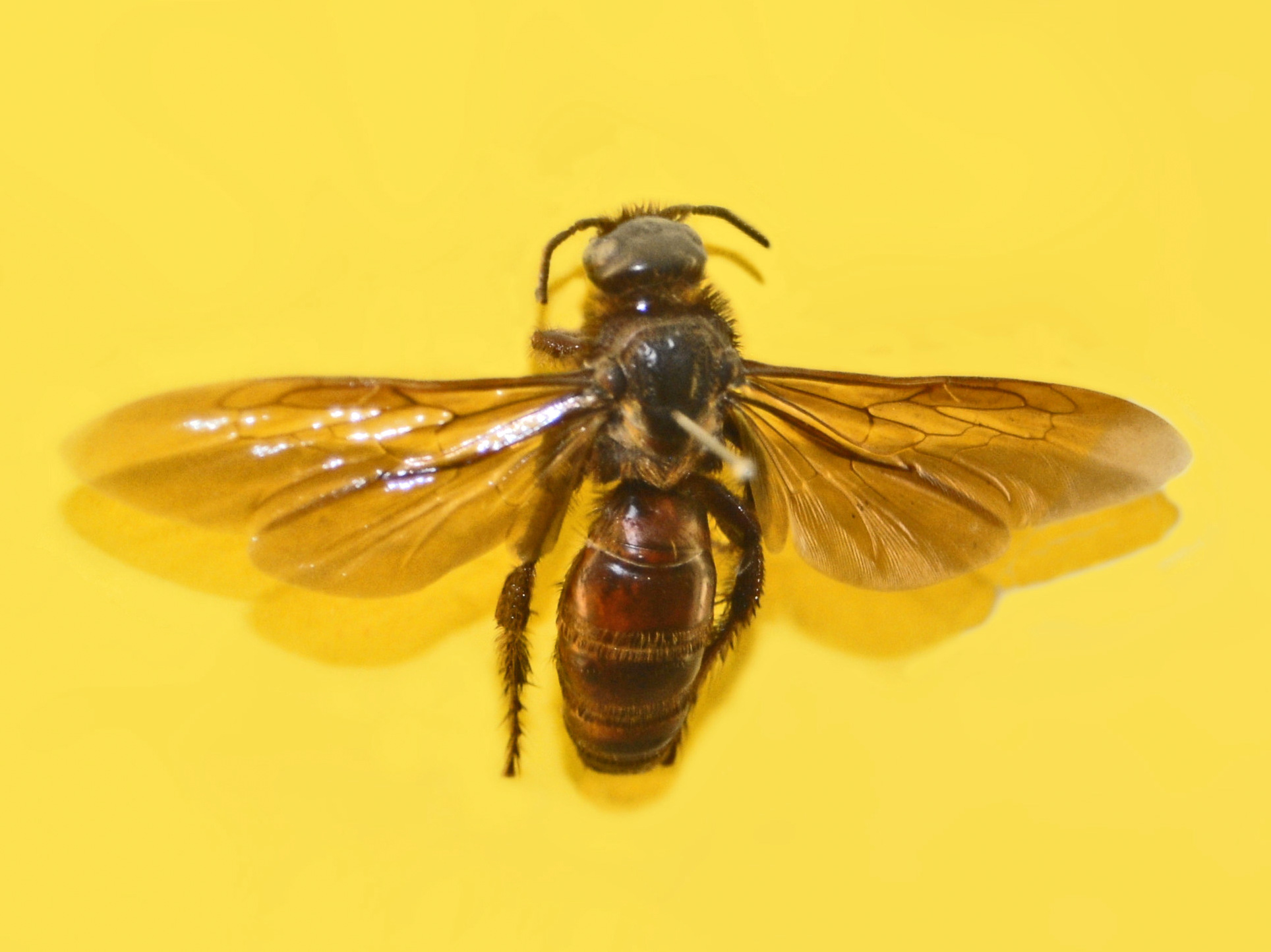
- Campsomeris vitripennis

Scientific classification
- Kingdom: Animalia
- Phylum: Arthropoda
- Clade: Pancrustacea
- Class: Insecta
- Order: Hymenoptera
- Family: Scoliidae
- Tribe: Campsomerini
- Genus: Campsomeris; Lepeletier, 1838

Type species
- Campsomeris atrata (Fabricius, 1775)

= Campsomeris =

Genus of wasps

Campsomeris is a Neotropical genus of the family Scoliidae, also known as the scoliid wasps. They are generally parasites of beetle larvae, most often of Scarabaeidae.

== Description and identification ==
Campsomeris are large wasps with completely black bodies in both sexes, including the setae and hind tibial spurs. The wings may be hyaline, orange, or violaceous depending on the species.

== Distribution ==
Species of this genus are known from the West Indies and from Guatemala south to northern Argentina and Chile.

== Species ==
Species within this genus include:

- Campsomeris atrata (Fabricius, 1775)
- Campsomeris peregrina (Lepeletier, 1845)
- Campsomeris regifica (Bradley, 1945)
- Campsomeris vitripennis (Smith, 1855)

== Gallery ==
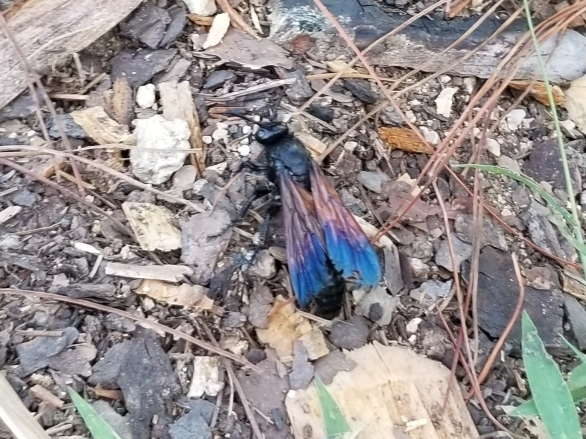
C. atrata photographed in the Dominican Republic.

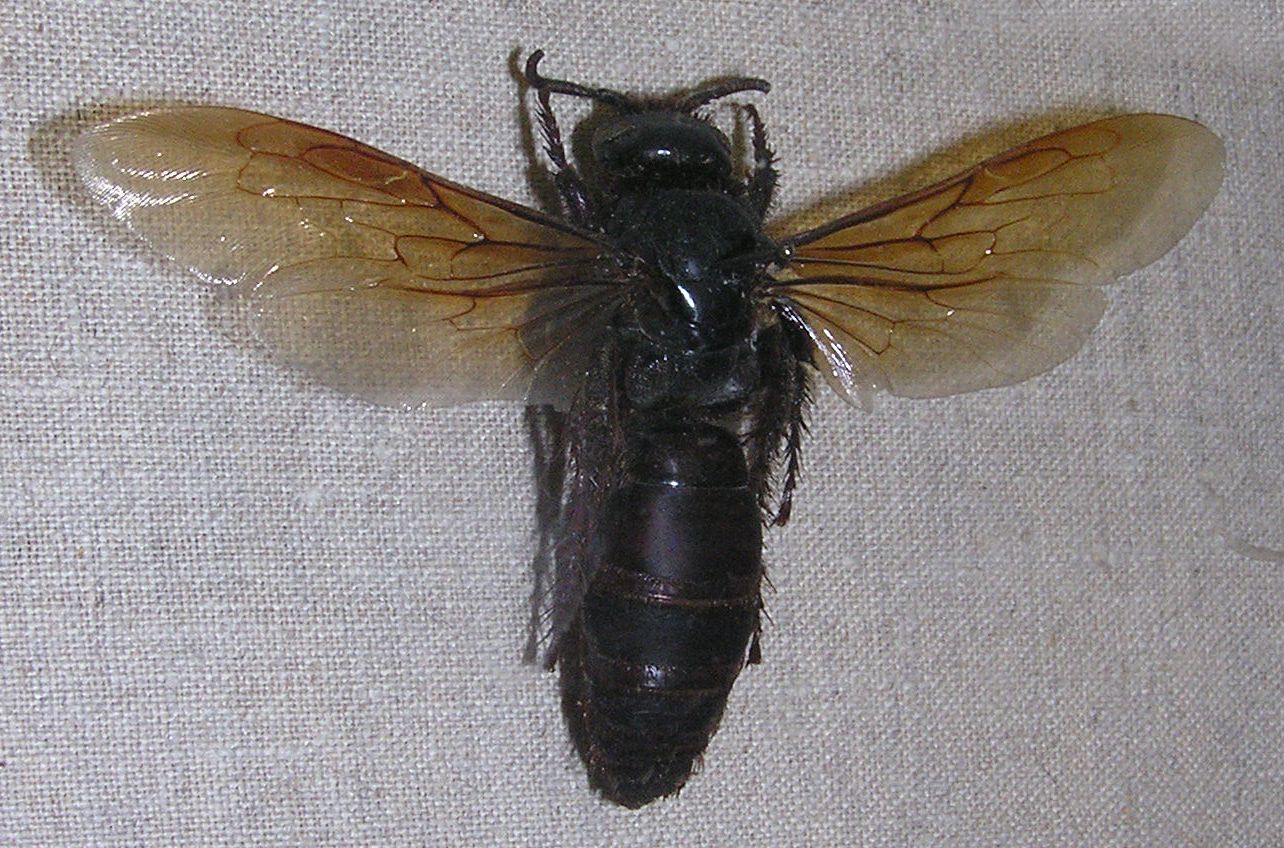
C. peregrina museum specimen

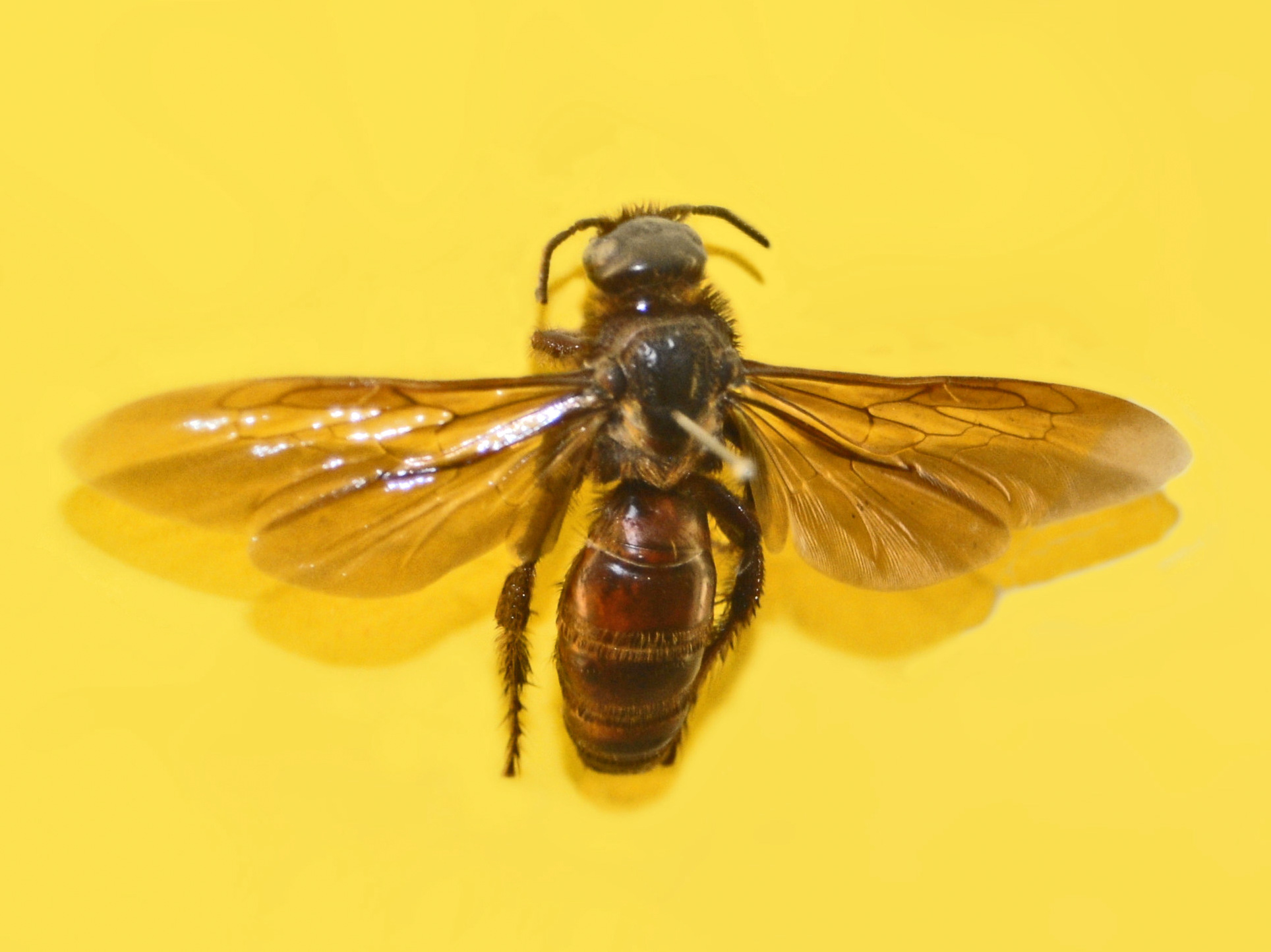
C. vitripennis museum specimen
