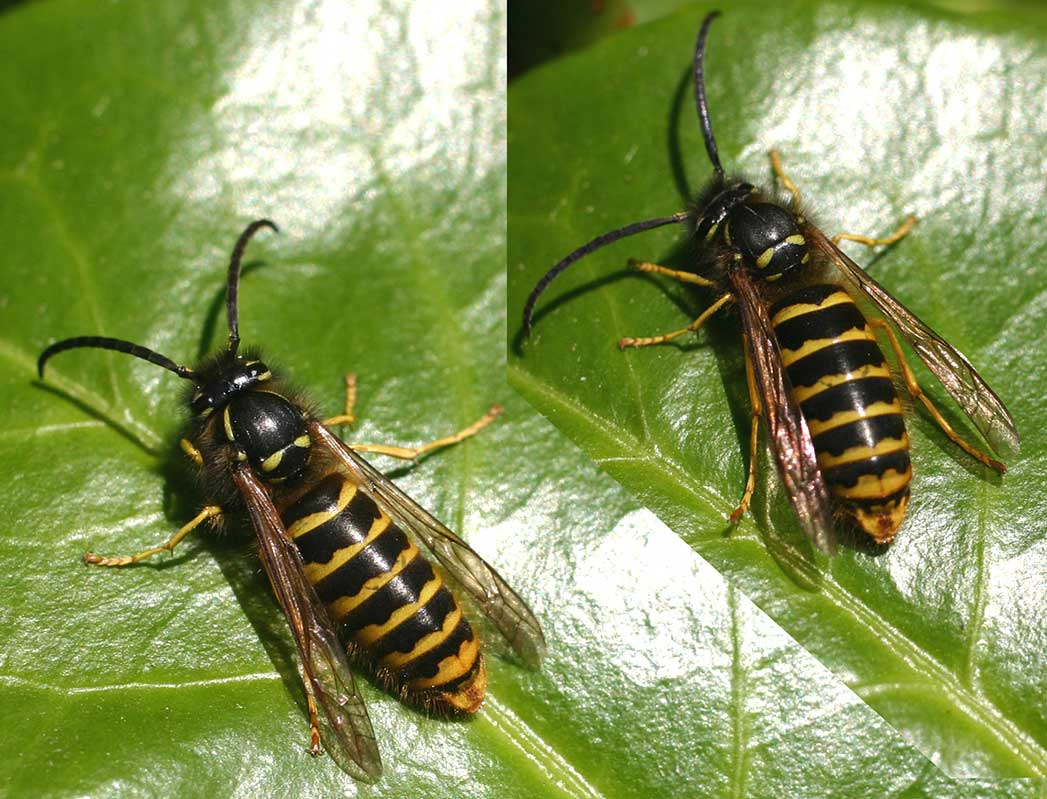
- Male D. media

Scientific classification
- Kingdom: Animalia
- Phylum: Arthropoda
- Class: Insecta
- Order: Hymenoptera
- Family: Vespidae
- Genus: Dolichovespula
- Species: D. media

Binomial name
- Dolichovespula media Retzius 1783
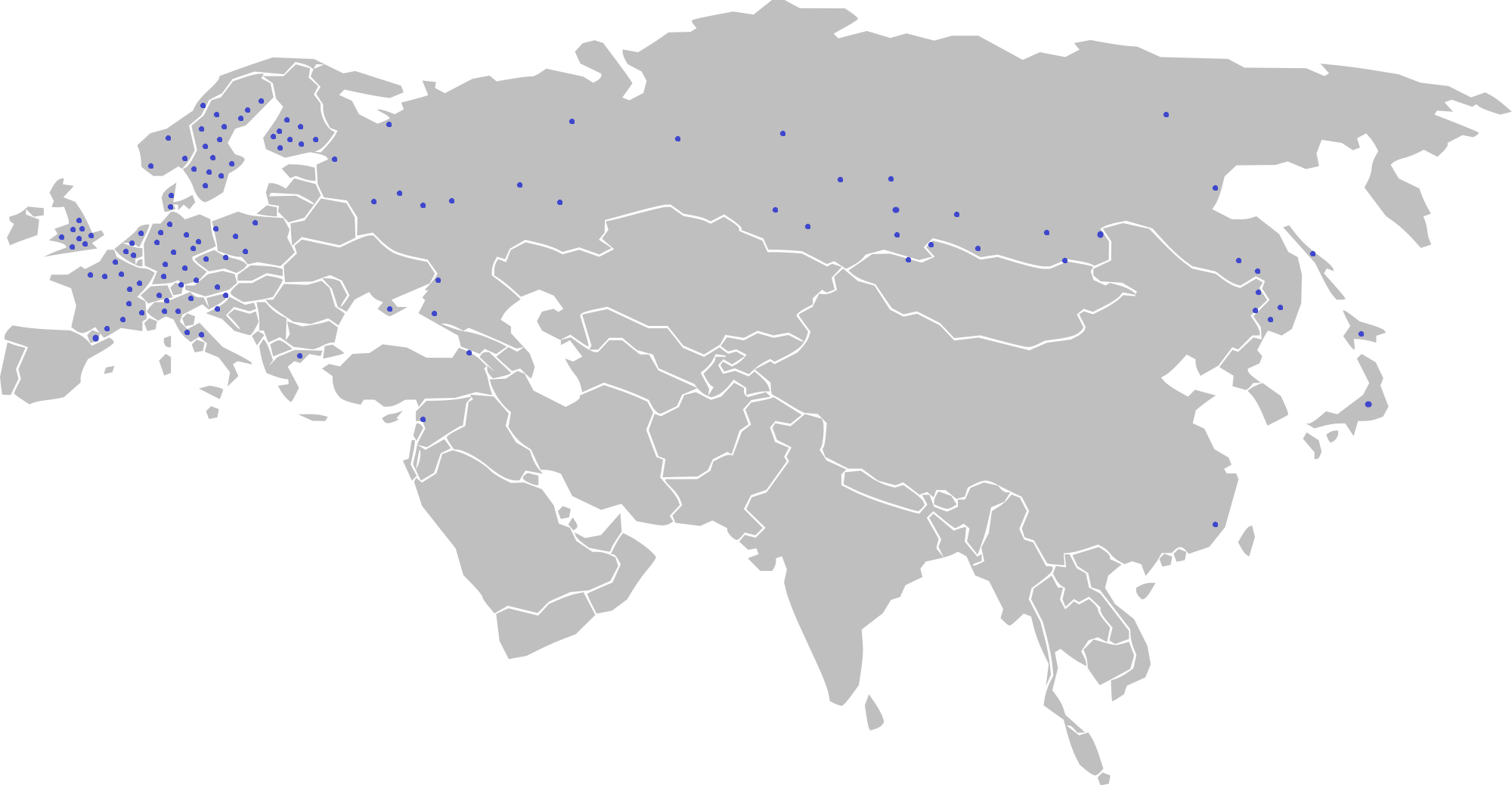
- Range of D. media

Synonyms
- Dolichovespula borealis Lee, 1986; Dolichovespula sugare Ishikawa, 1969; Dolichovespula conjugens Paul, 1943; Vespa crassa Herrich-Schaffer, 1841; Vespa flavicincta Schenck, 1853; Vespa geerii Lepeletier, 1836; Vespa lineolata Pérez, 1910; Vespa rufoscutellata Schenck, 1853; Vespa similis Schneck, 1853

= Median wasp =

Species of wasp

The median wasp (Dolichovespula media) is a species of social wasp of the family Vespidae found throughout Europe and Asia. It builds aerial paper nests often in shrubs or trees, and occasionally under the eaves of buildings. It is most common to see this wasp between May and October during its 3.3 month colony cycle. Behaviours of this wasp include nest defense, curling which is believed to function in brood incubation, and gastral vibration which is involved in larval feeding. The median wasp has a haplodiploid sex determination system that results in a high level of relatedness within the colony. This species is not usually aggressive but will sting if they feel their nest is threatened. Most foraging in the nest is done by the workers once the first ones reach adulthood. These workers forage for insects, nectar, and wood for nest construction in temperatures as low as 7 °C (45 °F). The median wasp is known to be occasionally affected by the fungus Cordyceps sphecocephala and the Cricket paralysis virus.

== Taxonomy and phylogeny ==
The median wasp was first classified by Anders Jahan Retzius in 1783. This wasp is part of the subfamily Vespinae which includes all hornets and yellowjackets. It is part of the genus Dolichovespula, a genus whose species include the tree wasp (D. sylvestris), the Saxon wasp (D. saxonica), the bald-faced hornet (D. maculata), the Arctic yellowjacket (D. norvegicoides), and the parasitic hornet (D. adulterina).

== Description and identification ==
D. media is a medium to large species of wasp around 16–22 millimetres (0.63–0.87 in) in length with yellow and black stripes on its abdomen. It can be identified by its yellow clypeus with a thin black central line and large areas of yellow behind the eyes and on the ocular sinus. The median wasp also has a shiny black thorax with four yellow spots that are tinted orange or red. Queens are often mistaken for hornets due to their reddish colouration, but can be distinguished by their thoracic spots and deep black color.

== Distribution and habitat ==
The median wasp has a Palearctic distribution and is found throughout Europe and temperate regions of Asia all the way east to Japan. It prefers temperate climates and high humidity. This species was identified in the United Kingdom for the first time in 1980 after having spread there from continental Europe. It has also been sighted in New Zealand, but it is not known if the wasp is widespread in the area or if this was an isolated occurrence.

D. media builds aerial paper nests 1 to 5 metres (3.3 to 16.4 ft) above ground. These nests are typically found in shrubs, trees, and sometimes under the eaves of buildings. Nests are made of paper that comes from the digestion of wood and are generally 12–23 centimetres (4.7–9.1 in) wide and 10–30 centimetres (3.9–11.8 in) tall. Colonies are often found in both urban and rural areas. These wasps prefer to build nests close to the ground where humidity levels are higher as well as in open areas where the nest is subject to large amounts of sunlight.

== Colony cycle ==
The colony cycle of D. media is about 3.3 months and occurs between early May and the end of August. The nests are initiated in early May when a single queen emerges from her overwintering hibernation site. All queens in the same region tend to emerge from hibernation and initiate nests at about the same time and do not disperse over weeks or months as in some other species.

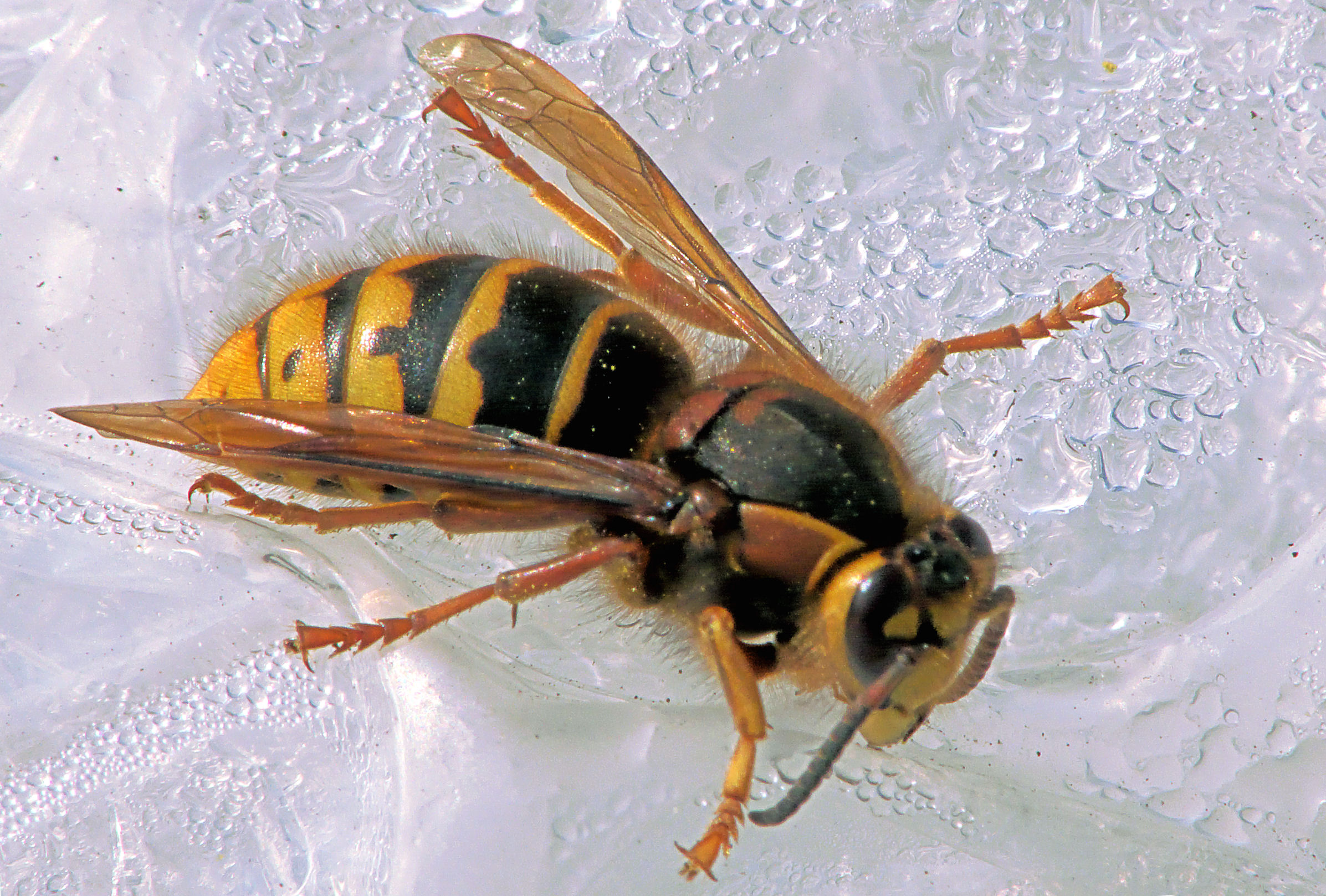
Queen

The queen rears about 10 workers by herself and it takes about 30 days for these workers to mature to adults from eggs. The first workers emerge around early June and start small cell building, where males and workers will be reared, and begin foraging for the colony. The colony continues to grow and large cell construction begins in early July which is where the new queens and some males will be raised. A mature median wasp nest will have about 1000 total cells. Around 320 will be small cells, 680 large cells, with an average of 800 wasps reaching adulthood. The first queens will emerge in early August and disperse to find hibernation sites. The rest of the workers, the old queen, and the males will begin to die off with the colony terminating by the end of August. However, workers are sometimes seen as late as early November.

== Nest structure ==
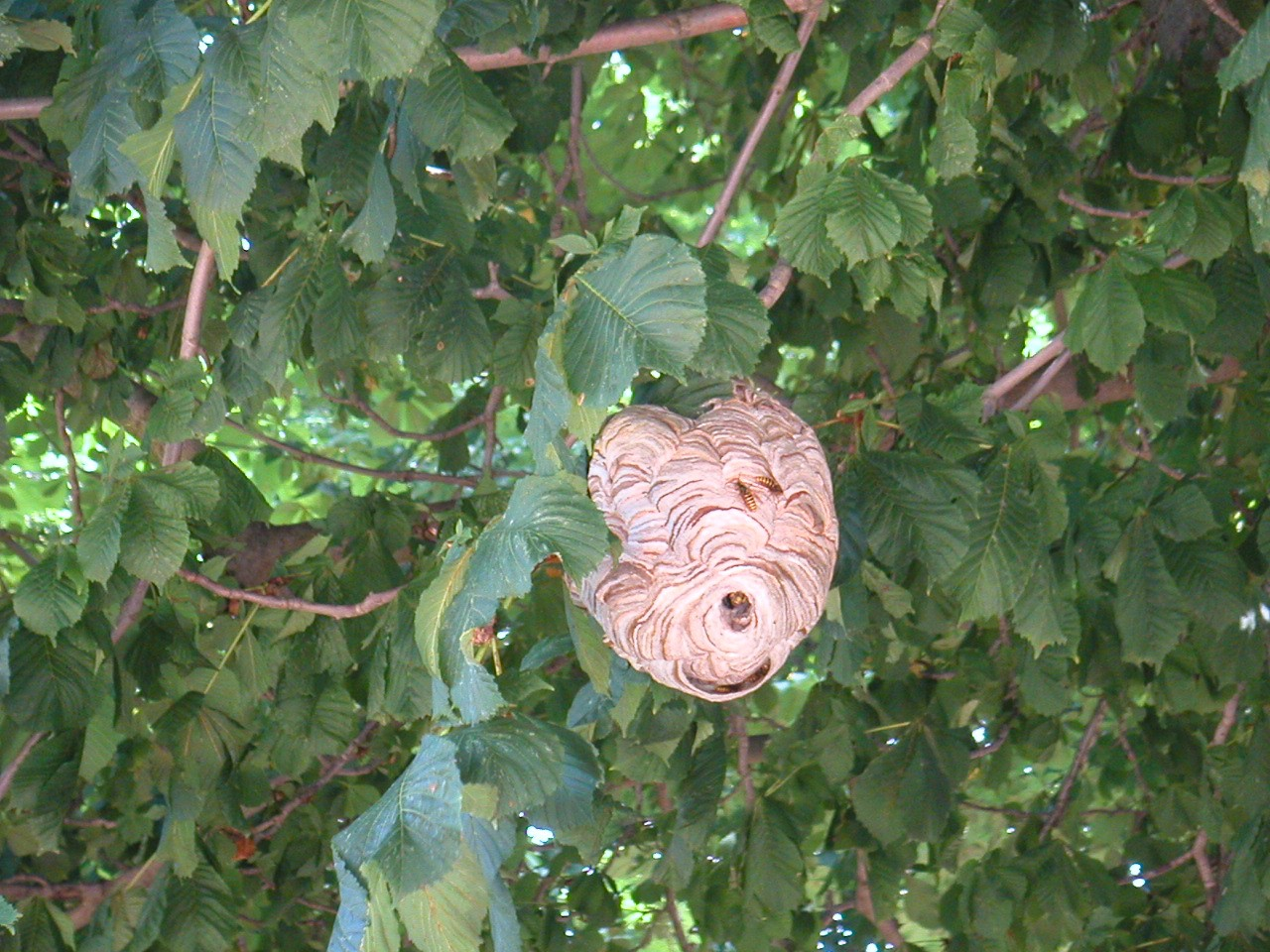
Nest

The median wasp like many other species of wasps builds its nest out of pulp that comes from the digestion of wood. Their nests have been reported to be light yellow or light to dark grey in color depending on the material used to build the nest. These nests are about 10–30 centimetres (3.9–11.8 in) tall and 12–23 centimetres (4.7–9.1 in) wide with a 2–5 centimetres (0.79–1.97 in) thick roof. Mature nests have 2-4 circular or oval shaped combs that are surrounded by a thick envelope. There are two types of elements connecting combs. One is a rigid column down the center of the nest and the other is thin ribbon like pieces between the combs. Both are made of pulp and help to give the nest support. The entrance hole is at the bottom of the nest and often has spiraled sheets of paper surrounding it. The entrance of young nests sometimes consists of a long vestibule, or entry compartment, whose function is unknown. This long vestibule has only been observed in D. media and D. maculata species and tends to disappear as the nest matures. It may function in thermoregulation or defense. This species lives in cooler temperate climates and nests in the open so thermoregulation is a plausible explanation, but so far no other vestibule of this length have been observed in species that live in similar climates. A mature nest will house about 800 mature adults between May and October. Come October the males and workers begin to die off and the queen hibernates until next spring when she will begin a new nest.

== Behaviour ==
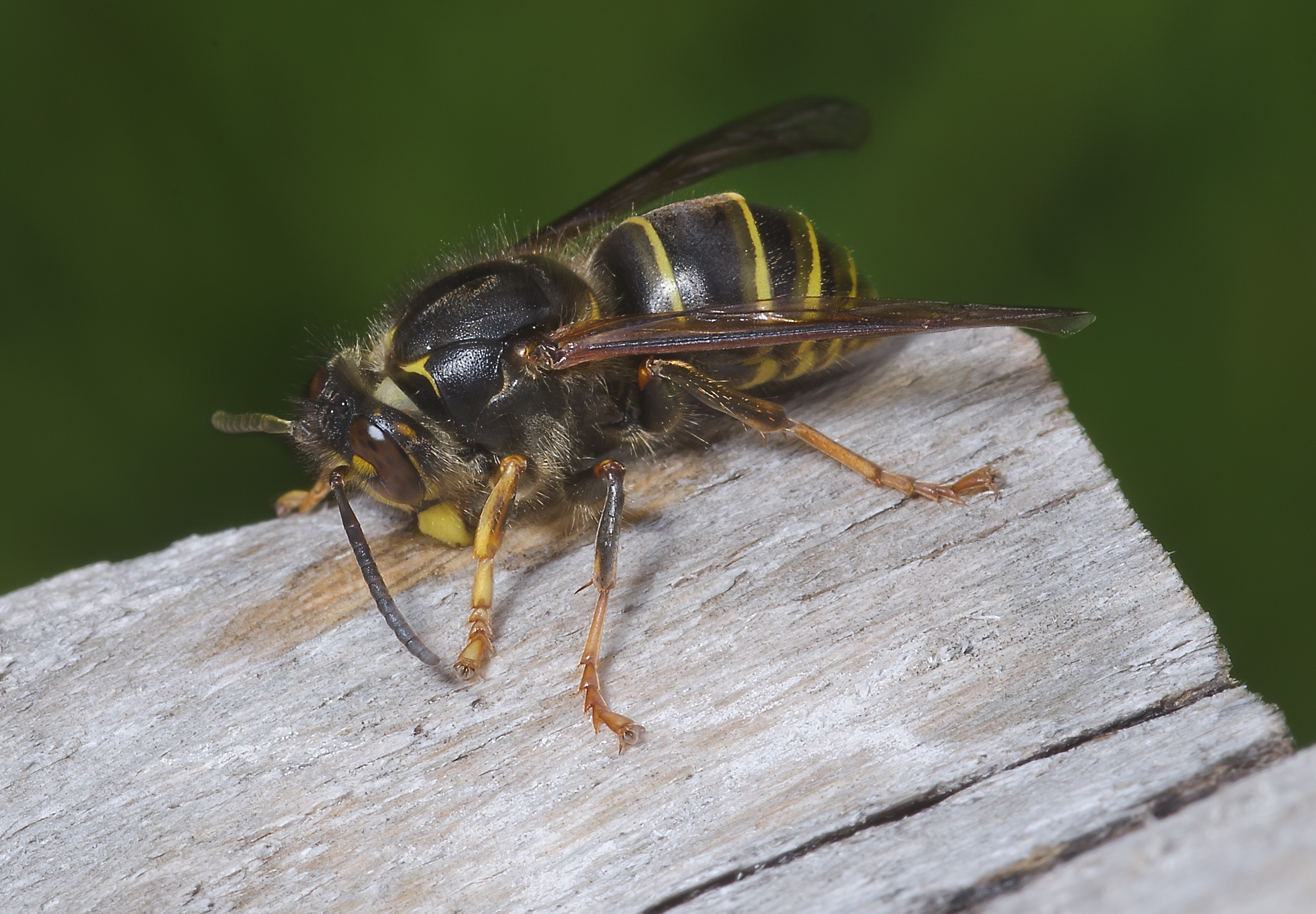
Worker rasping wood fibers

=== Foraging ===
In the median wasp foraging activities take place throughout the day and can be done in temperatures as low as 7 °C (45 °F). The queen is responsible for all nest construction and foraging until after the first workers emerge from the nest as adults. This means the queen does all of the foraging for about 30 days before workers take over. At the beginning she mainly focuses on collecting fiber for envelope construction, but as the colony begins to develop she allots more time for foraging for food including both flesh and liquid. Workers begin helping with larval feeding and nest development when just a few days old and take their orientation flight at about 5 days old. At this point they begin to take over food and material collection for the nest. These foraging trips can last between a few minutes to one hour, but most are less than 10 minutes in length. As D. media searches for prey it stops for a moment over each flower in contrast to other species such as V. flaviceps which quickly fly up and down each plant. They will fly up to a couple hundred meters to forage for food.

=== Defence ===
This species of wasp is not particularly aggressive. When a young nest is disturbed the foundress will first place her head at the entrance in an alert position. Then she flies quickly around the nest and may fall suddenly to the ground. This falling to the ground has only been observed in Dolichovespula species and its purpose is unclear. When small insects such as ants or spiders crawl on the nest the wasp responds by grabbing them in her mandibles and dropping to the ground. It is usually not necessary for her to try to keep these insects out of the nest as they are rarely seen to try and enter. Once there are some workers in a young nest the queen and workers cooperate to defend it.

=== Curling ===
Curling is one behaviour that is known only in the subfamily Vespinae and has been observed in nine species among three separate genera including the species D. media. Curling is an act of the queen where she curls her body around the pedicel of the nest when resting. The pedicel is the vertical part of the nest that gives it structure and what the combs are built around. This behaviour is almost always preceded by the queen turning around the pedicel before starting to curl. The queen most often curls at the pedicel for several minutes at a time. It is thought that this behaviour functions in brood incubation. This idea is supported by the evidence that the behaviour is present while there are only eggs and larvae in the nest but stops after many of the larvae have pupated. In addition, one study involving Vespa simillima showed that cell wall temperature rose by an average of 2.5–4.0 °C (36.5–39.2 °F) and remained constant during curling. The rise in temperature and timing of the behaviour suggest that it is important in incubation for the offspring while they are eggs and larvae. Heat for later eggs and larvae is believed to be generated by pupa and other larvae as the colony size increases.

=== Gastral vibration and tapping ===
Another behaviour observed in D. media workers is gastral vibration. This is observed in workers of many Dolichovespula and Vespula species. Workers tap their gaster rapidly up and down onto the comb of the nest and this is associated with feeding of larvae. The behaviour typically occurs while wasps are walking on the comb and ceases after feeding each larvae a small amount of flesh and then resumes before feeding the next larvae. A behaviour that appears to be homologous to this is observed in the foundresses queen and is called tapping. Queens have been observed tapping mid or hind legs on the comb after returning with prey. These taps can last from a few seconds to a couple of minutes and are loud enough to be heard outside of the nest. This signal is believed to function in the same way as gastral vibration in workers and is to signal to the larvae when it is time to feed. Sometimes this tapping or vibration occurs even when there is no pellet to feed the larvae and it is speculated that this corresponds to the feeding of liquids, but this has not been confirmed. Tapping continues in the queen even after she has ceased foraging when she feeding larvae pellets that she receives from the workers. This supports the idea that it is involved in signaling larvae during feeding.

== Genetic relatedness within colonies ==
=== Haplodiploidy ===
The median wasp, as in all other Hymenoptera species, produces females from fertilised diploid eggs, but males are produced from unfertilised haploid eggs. This means that although workers are unable to mate they can still produce male offspring. This type of sex determination is known as haplodiploidy. The result is that brothers have a relatedness of 0.5 as expected of full siblings, but sisters have a higher relatedness of 0.75. Sisters receive half of their mother's genes as well as all their father's genes because all of the sperm he produces are identical. Mothers have a relatedness of 0.5 to both their sons and daughters.

=== Worker-worker relatedness ===
Most Dolichovespula species including D. media mate only once or fertilise most eggs with sperm from a single male. In addition, there are only 1-2 queens per colony. These specific characteristics result in a high level of worker-worker relatedness within the colony. One study estimated this relatedness to be as high as 0.71. This was determined by analysing 20 workers from each of 10 nests at 3 DNA microsatellite locuses. The DNA analysis allowed the researchers to determine if males were queen's or workers’ sons and from there calculate an estimated relatedness. There is evidence that workers in this species attempt to reproduce with about 4 reproducing workers per colony that sometimes lay eggs, however, only 7.4% of the male population are produced by the workers. It has been observed that the median wasp participates in worker policing where the queen or other workers throw worker laid eggs out of the nest or otherwise destroy them. All of this information helps to explain the high level of relatedness in the colony and that relatedness helps to explain the eusocial behaviour of these wasps.

== Worker-queen conflict ==
Conflict often develops between queens and workers of haplodiploid species because workers are more related to their sisters than their brothers or their parental queens. This results in them trying to push the sex ratio so that there are more females produced by the queen than males. At the same time, however, it is best for the queen to keep a 1:1 ratio of male and female offspring because she is equally related to both. D. media workers and queens have been observed policing worker laid eggs which helps to push the ratio more towards the females. This may help to keep worker-queen conflict from getting worse since workers do not produce many offspring in the nest.

== Parasites and pathogens ==
Ophiocordyceps sphecocephala is a type of fungus that is known to attack wasps including D. media. It produces red-yellow fruiting bodies on long white or yellow stalks. It is not known if this fungus kills living wasps or if it simply attacks dead insects, but there is some evidence to suggest that overwintering queens can be infected. Either way this fungus is not a major threat to a wasp colony. A pathogen that has been found to infect the median wasp is the Cricket paralysis virus. This virus causes insects to become paralyzed and die with a nearly 100% mortality rate once infected. Once a nest is infected this virus could quickly destroy the entire colony, however, there is little data documenting how widespread this virus is among D. media.

== Human importance ==
Median wasps may be considered a pest by some because their nests are usually built in shrubs or on houses where they are easily disturbed. These nests are typically built out in the open and are often destroyed by people. Despite this the species is not very aggressive and tends to fly away instead of attack if disturbed. However, it may sting if it feels its nest is threatened. The sting of the median wasp is comparable to many other wasp species and should be treated with a cold compress and an antihistamine to reduce swelling unless a more serious allergic reaction occurs. D. media is attracted to sweet foods and as such may fly near food when people are eating. Median wasps are easily scared off and do not usually become aggressive. This species is more likely to be seen as a pest when it invades a new area due to its impact on the environment. One example is a median wasp that has been spotted in New Zealand. If the wasp becomes widespread and feeds on native flies, moths, and nectar it will compete for resources with other species. Its large size may also cause alarm in new areas.
