= Emery's rule =

Trend of parasitic organisms

Emery's rule is the trend of social parasites to be parasites to species or genera they are closely related to.

== History ==
In 1909, the Italian entomologist Carlo Emery noted that social parasites among insects (e.g., kleptoparasites) tend to be parasites of species or genera to which they are closely related.

Over time, this pattern has been recognized in many additional cases, and generalized to what is now known as Emery's rule.

== In nature ==
The pattern is best known for various taxa of Hymenoptera. For example, the social wasp Dolichovespula adulterina parasitizes other members of its genus such as Dolichovespula norwegica and Dolichovespula arenaria. Emery's rule is also applicable to members of other kingdoms such as fungi, red algae, and mistletoe. The significance and general relevance of this pattern are still a matter of some debate, as a great many exceptions exist, though a common explanation for the phenomenon when it occurs is that the parasites may have started as facultative parasites within the host species itself (such forms of intraspecific parasitism are well-known, even in some species of bees), but later became reproductively isolated and split off from the ancestral species, a form of sympatric speciation.

When a parasitic species is a sister taxon to its host in a phylogenetic sense, the relationship is considered to be in "strict" adherence to Emery's rule. When the parasite is a close relative of the host but not its sister species, the relationship is in "loose" adherence to the rule.
