= Worker policing =

Insects destroying eggs not laid by queen

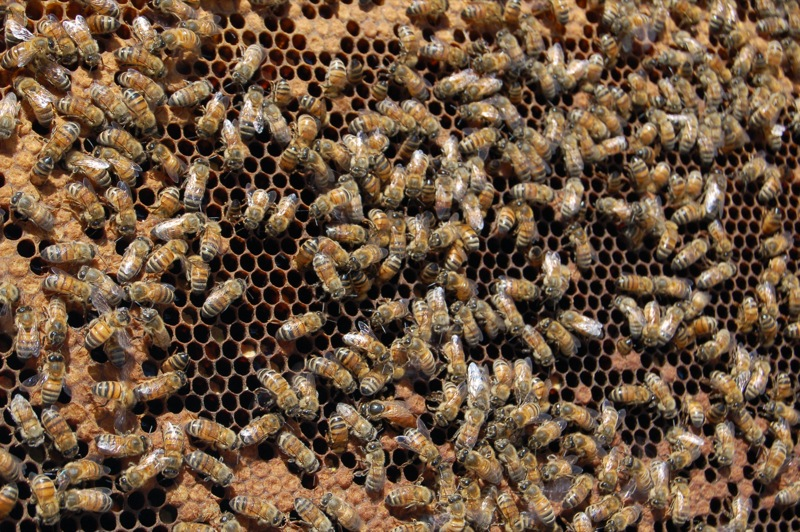
Worker policing is found in honey bees and other hymenopterans including some species of bumblebees, ants and wasps.

Worker policing is a behavior seen in colonies of social hymenopterans (ants, bees, and wasps) whereby worker females eat or remove eggs that have been laid by other workers rather than those laid by a queen. Worker policing ensures that the offspring of the queen will predominate in the group. In certain species of bees, ants and wasps, workers or the queen may also act aggressively towards fertile workers. Worker policing has been suggested as a form of coercion to promote the evolution of altruistic behavior in eusocial insect societies.

Proposed mechanisms for the recognition of worker-laid eggs or active reproductive workers include marker hydrocarbons on the surface of queen-laid eggs, cuticle hydrocarbons on reproductive workers, and recognition of nest-mates. In rare cases, worker-laid eggs carry mimicked queen hydrocarbons and escape policing, a condition known as the anarchic syndrome.

Not all forms of policing require the presence of a queen; it also occurs in a few species of ants which establish a dominance hierarchy of reproductive female workers, where top-ranking individuals reproduce.

== Evolutionary basis ==
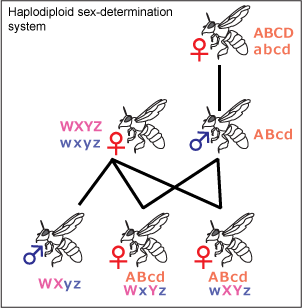
The haplodiploid sex determination system has consequences for worker policing behavior.

In many social insect communities, sex is determined through haplodiploidy. Haploid male drones develop from unfertilized eggs while diploid females develop from fertilized eggs. Queens of a colony may mate with one or several drones. In many species of ants, bees, and wasps, workers retain functional ovaries, but cannot mate. Thus, they only produce male offspring. On average, a queen shares half of her genes with her sons, but only shares a quarter of her genes with the sons of fertile female workers. Therefore, it is in the queen's best interests to have her own sons raised, and not the sons of workers.

By contrast, the worker shares half of her genes with her sons and only a quarter with her brothers. Furthermore, the workers in colonies with a single once-mated queen are related to their nephews by three eighths, higher than they are related to brothers. This results in a conflict in which the queen and worker females are at odds over the proportion of male offspring they contribute, since each side tries to maximize its reproductive fitness. Queens favor production of their own sons while workers favor production of their own sons, and do not stop their sisters from laying because of the favorable relatedness to nephews.

Worker policing occurs when worker bees in the colony are genetically more closely related to the queen than the reproductive female. In many instances, the eggs of the female worker are eaten, or she is repeatedly attacked by other workers. This mechanism of egg removal ensures that the queen's sons predominate.

Experiments confirming the role of kin selection in worker policing demonstrate the effects of multiple matings, which can lead to lower average relatedness between workers. Queens of the social wasp Dolichovespula saxonica mate singly or multiply. Researchers who study these wasps have observed a strong positive correlation between worker relatedness and male production. After controlling for the absolute number of eggs laid, these scientists conclude that the queen's multiple matings favor mutual worker policing.

Although early theories of worker policing focused on the kin selection component, evidence from honey bees suggests that altruism is sometimes enforced. Fewer workers reproduce as policing effectiveness rises, and policing effectiveness decreases with increasing relatedness except in colonies with no queen. This suggests that worker policing is a social sanction imposed on selfish individuals.

== Proposed mechanisms for kin recognition ==
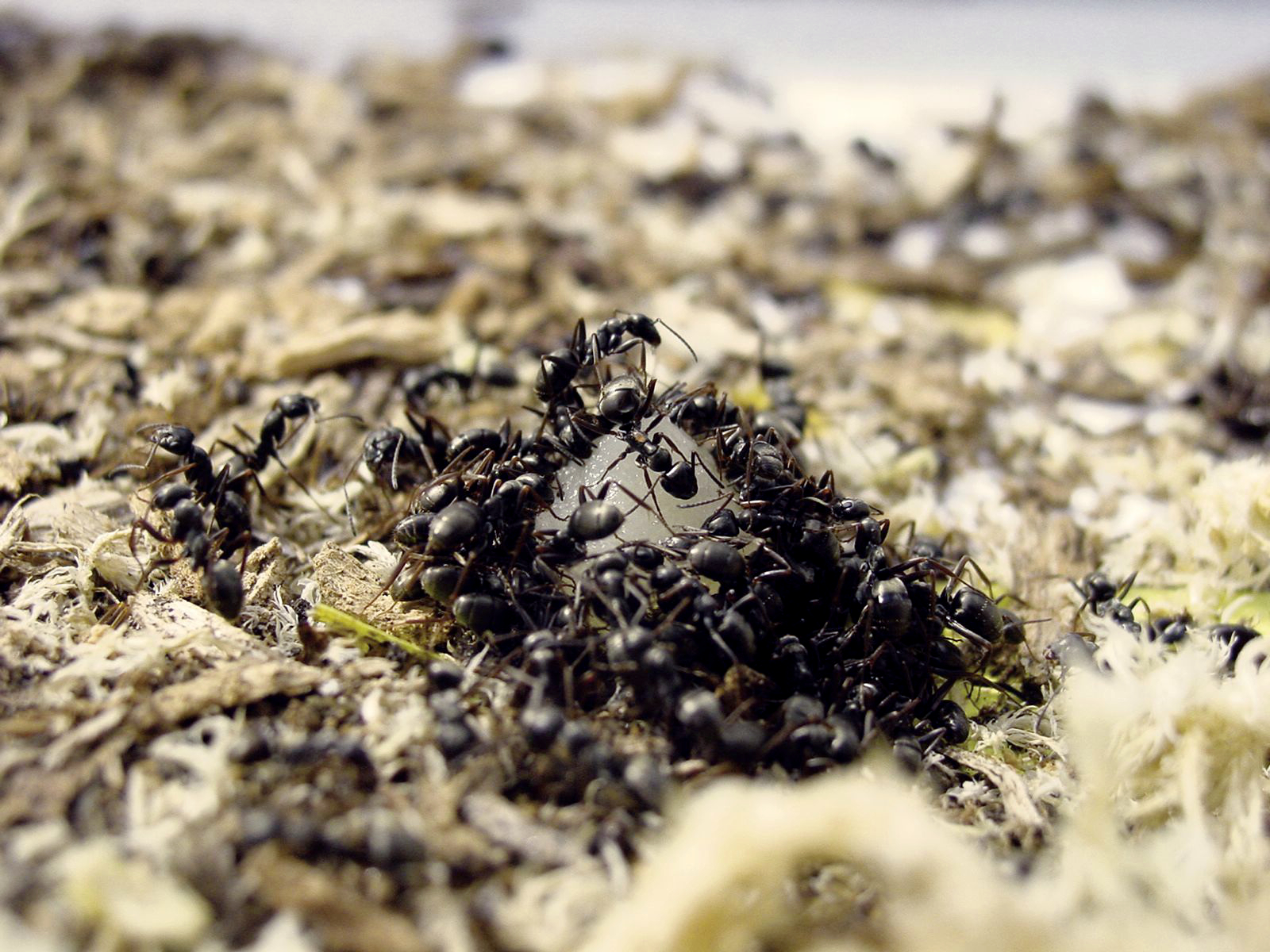
Formica fusca ants can recognize nest-mates.

Mechanisms suggested for egg discrimination in worker policing include queen hydrocarbons, fertile worker hydrocarbons, and nestmate recognition.

=== Queen hydrocarbons ===
A study of the carpenter ant Camponotus floridanus found a special surface hydrocarbon on queen-laid eggs. Workers in the colony with the queen's eggs refrained from egg-laying, whereas other groups that did not have queen-laid eggs showed worker reproduction. Thus, the hydrocarbon could act as a signal to alert workers to halt reproduction. More generally, however, the authors concluded that the hydrocarbons were a fertility signal. It is still unknown as to how the decision to restrain reproduction occurs or what minimum threshold of fertility in the queen is needed to reduce worker reproduction.

=== Fertile worker hydrocarbons ===
The study of cuticle hydrocarbons has also been applied to the reproductive workers. In some colonies of the ponerine ant Platythyrea punctata, the presence of CHCs in new reproductive workers triggered aggressive behavior from the rest of the colony, often between new and old reproductive workers. Specifically, the old reproductive workers rubbed a marker hydrocarbon on the antennae of the new females, identifying them as rivals and targets for aggression.

=== Nestmate recognition ===
In contrast to the other ant species, worker policing in the ant Formica fusca appears to incorporate nestmate recognition in addition to the queen hydrocarbons. Workers displayed higher levels of aggression toward non-nest mates and also removed some queen-laid eggs. Thus, queen hydrocarbons were not the only contributor to discrimination of the eggs.

== Examples from social Hymenoptera ==
Worker policing has evolved convergently in several social insect species. The following cases are examples:

=== Bees ===
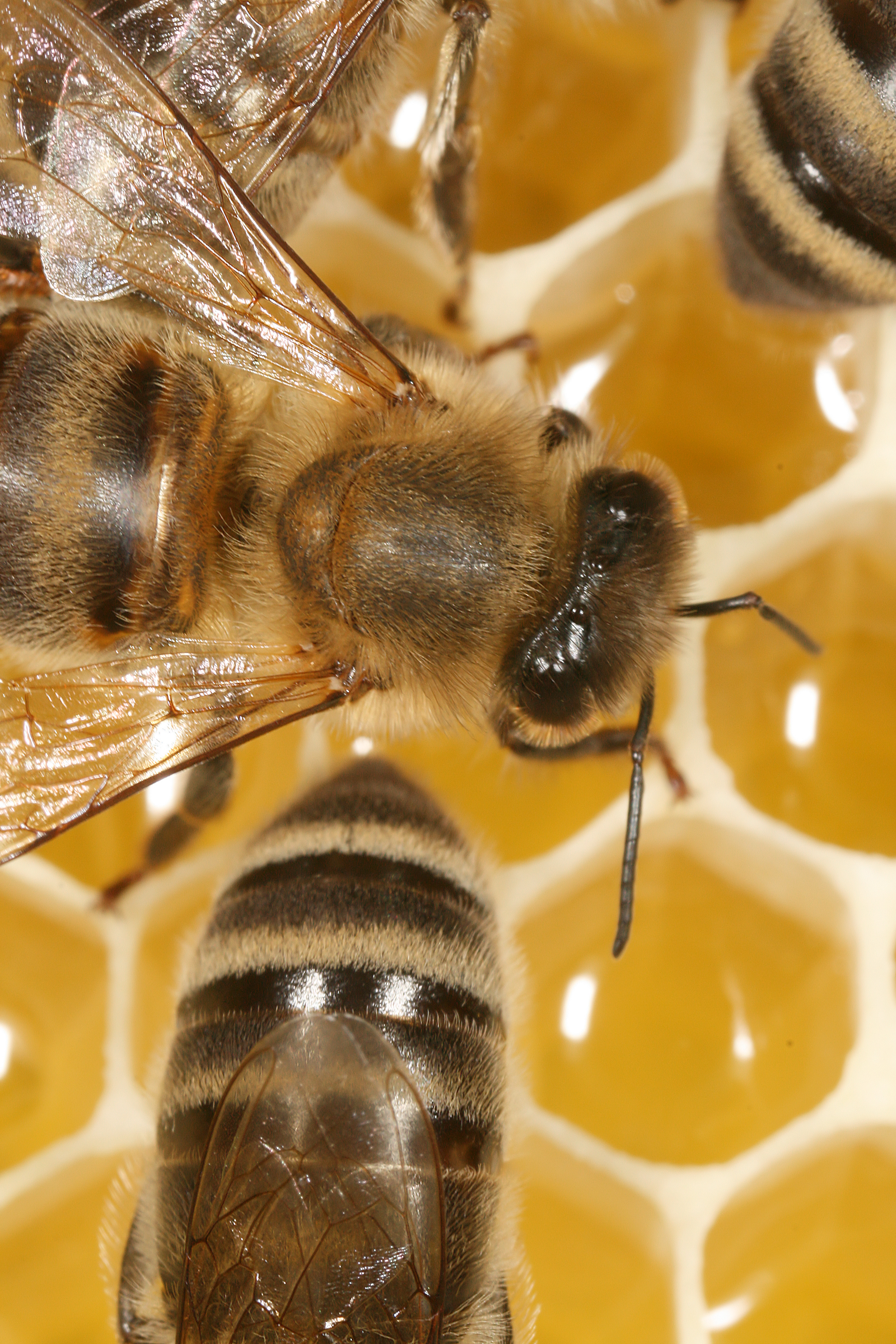
Apis mellifera workers remove worker-laid eggs by eating them (oophagy).

One of the first examples of worker policing to be discovered was in the honey bee, Apis mellifera. Worker policing is prevalent in most honey bee colonies, and worker reproduction is minimal (0.12%) in this species. Worker policing occurs via egg-eating in Apis mellifera colonies. In many of these hives, the activation of ovaries in fertile females is diminished, suggesting that there are disincentives to laying eggs.

Workers in colonies of the dwarf honey bee, Apis florea, are also reported to engage in oophagy. Using microsatellite analysis, researchers concluded that no mature drones had non-queen alleles in the colonies they investigated. Thus, even though workers had activated ovaries and were capable of laying eggs, worker policing ensured the functional sterility of otherwise fertile workers.

A higher percentage of female workers of the bee species Apis cerana are reported to activate their ovaries than those of Apis mellifera or Apis florea. When queens were removed, up to 40% of the workers activated their ovaries in subsequent days. However, policing workers continued to eat the worker-laid eggs, suggesting that the mechanism of policing in this species does not involve direct intervention from the queen.

The observation that all these Apis species engage in polyandry has led researchers to conclude that worker policing is plesiomorphic for the Apis genus.

Worker policing also occurs in the primitively eusocial bumblebees such as Bombus terrestris.

=== Ants ===
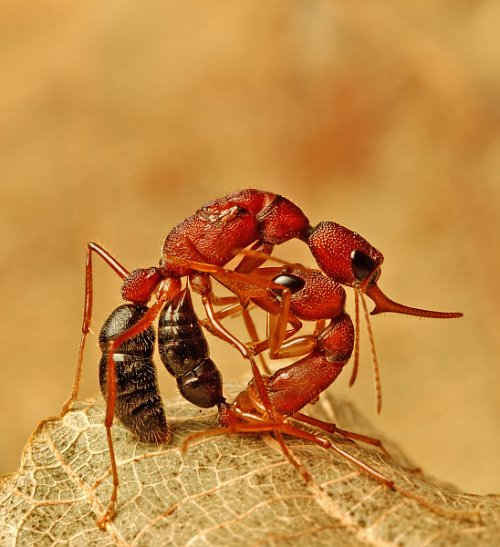
Worker of Harpegnathos saltator killing a foreign queen

In colonies of the ponerine ant, Pachycondyla inversa, workers eat the eggs of fertile female workers, known as gamergates, and display aggressive behavior towards egg-laying females.

In colonies of the ant Gnamptogenys menadensis, workers will sometimes mate and lay eggs while others remain as virgins to lay trophic eggs to be used as food. In a display of policing, workers can immobilize female reproductive workers by biting their limbs; it is reported that 50% of the victims die from this treatment. The attacking workers may also drag offending workers outside the colony. Since workers can lay both male and female eggs, worker policing could be favored as the cost to the community is large.

The ant species Aphaenogaster smythiesi japonica also display evidence of policing. When researchers separated and then reunited workers from colonies that did or did not have queens, workers from the queen-containing colonies attacked the workers with activated ovaries from the queenless colonies.

In the queenless ant Streblognathus peetersi, policing helps to select gamergates. The workers immobilize gamergates with lowered fertility, enabling high-ranking workers to take over as new gamergates.

In the ponerine ant Harpegnathos saltator, worker policing prevents the number of reproductive workers from becoming excessive. The species has gamergates, which lay eggs but rarely carry out any other tasks, so having too many of them would reduce the colony's efficiency. Gamergate numbers are rather stable, as infertile workers target newly ovipositing workers by jumping on and holding them: this efficiently inhibits them from laying eggs, and within a few weeks they revert to being subordinate and infertile workers. However, once new ovipositing workers attain a gamergate's level of ovarian activity, the infertile (policing) workers ignore them. The signal used by the policing workers consists of cuticle hydrocarbons transmitted only by direct contact, rather than being a pheromone detected by olfaction. Similarly, the inhibition of ovipositing workers is achieved by direct physical aggression by policing workers, not by any pheromone produced by queens or gamergates.

=== Wasps ===
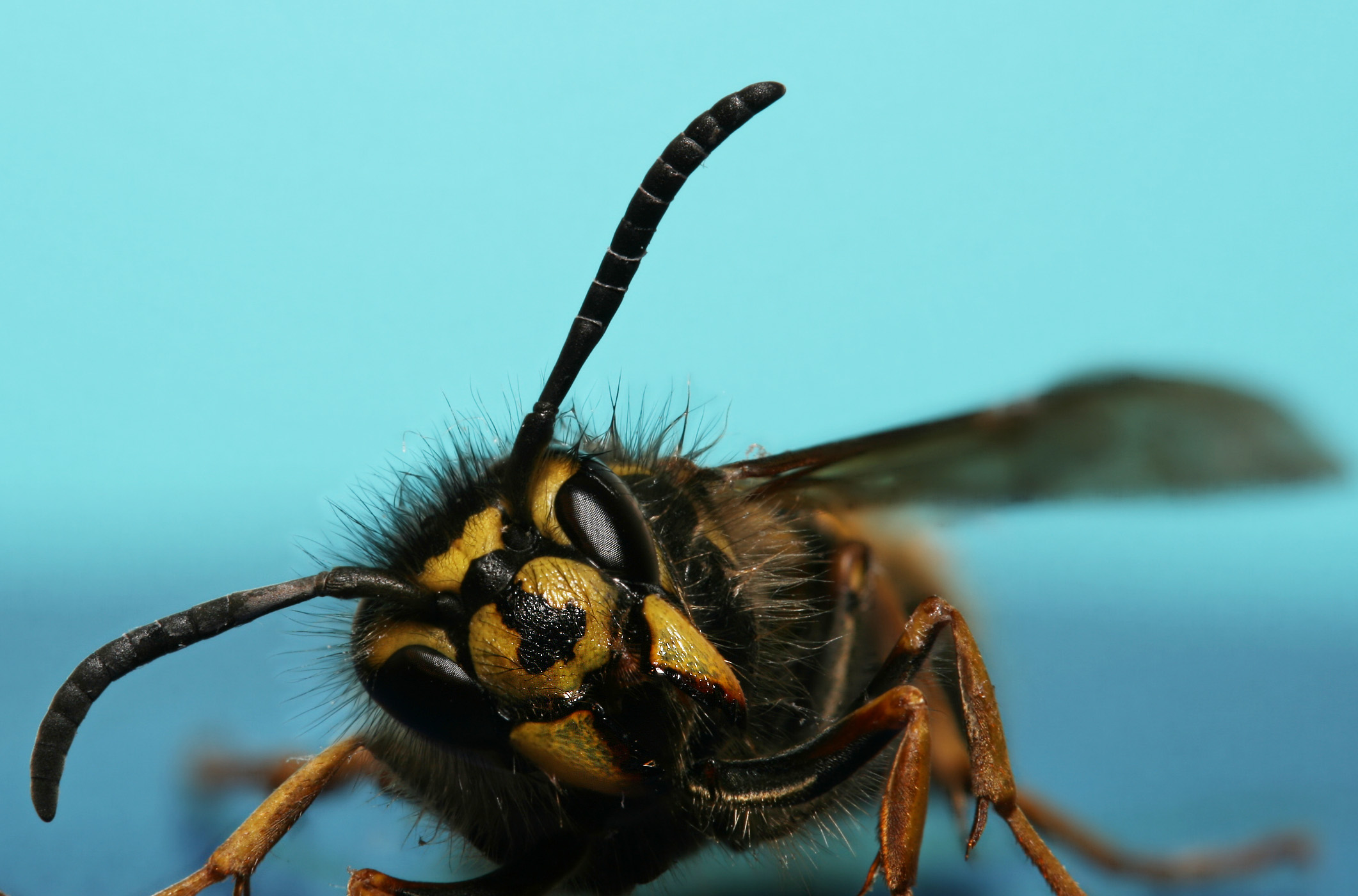
Dolichovespula sylvestris workers can display aggression towards other fertile workers.

The tree wasp Dolichovespula sylvestris also displays worker policing. Both egg-eating and aggression are reported in these wasp communities, and the queen also engages in the policing process. Similar behavior has been observed in the closely related species Dolichovespula media.

In colonies of the paper wasp, Polistes chinensis antennalis, workers can lay up to a quarter of the male eggs in the colony. The number of eggs that survived to hatching, however, was minimal compared to the number produced by the queen. Analysis of the microsatellite markers showed that both queens and workers contributed to policing of worker and queen-laid eggs even in monogynous and monandrous colonies.

The common wasp, Vespula vulgaris, engages in worker policing, and it is known that a significant number of workers have active ovaries. However, studies by researchers have suggested that relatedness may not be the key factor in the development of worker policing. Rather, it is hypothesized that worker policing has been selected due to conflict suppression in the colony.

In a test of worker policing, researchers examined the removal of worker-laid eggs in Vespula rufa, a wasp that has low paternity. Under the testing conditions, worker policing was not as efficient, and some of the drones appeared to be from worker-laid eggs.

The European hornet, Vespa crabro, was previously thought to be under reproductive pheromone control by the queen, thus explaining why the other females did not reproduce, even though they were capable of doing so. Experiments by Foster showed that the workers were instead regulating sterility in each other, thus instead exhibiting worker policing. While each worker is capable of reproducing, the colony as a whole is more efficient and organized if the workers allow only the queen to lay larvae.

Synoeca cyanea also engage in worker policing during times when queen repopulation is not needed. They will prevent females from laying eggs through aggressive behavior and egg-eating.

== Exceptions ==
=== Anarchic syndrome ===
Very rarely, female worker bees lay eggs that escape worker policing, in a process known as the anarchic syndrome. Female reproductive workers in these colonies activate their ovaries even in the presence of a queen. The worker eggs are allowed as they mimic queen hydrocarbons. Thus, female workers can maximize their reproductive fitness at the expense of the colony. Anarchic syndrome is an example of selection working in opposite directions at individual and group levels.

=== Selfish worker policing ===
Temnothorax unifasciatus, a myrmicinid ant, has been shown not to have collective worker policing. However, when a queen is removed, a rank order for reproduction appears, where top ranking reproductives display aggression towards lower-order female workers. Thus, reductions in egg laying are created by dominance hierarchies. Individuals do not act in benefit of the colony, instead opting to increase their own fitness by laying their eggs and reducing the contributions of opponents.

This type of policy is common in Dolichovespula norwegica wasps where despite being more related to other workers' sons, worker-laid eggs were consumed by other workers.

=== Worker policing without genetic conflict ===
In the thelytokous ant Platythyrea punctata, colonies are clonal; therefore, workers are all equally related genetically, and worker policing is not expected as there is no genetic conflict. However, one would expect severe effects on the condition of the colony if reproductive workers were left unchecked. For example, more time spent on individual reproduction would be predicted to detract from care of the queen's offspring. In studies of these ants, workers did actually display worker policing, as evidenced by increased aggression towards reproductive workers. Worker policing here is favored for group efficiency.
