= Dolichovespula pacifica xanthicincta =

Scientific classification
- Kingdom: Animalia
- Phylum: Arthropoda
- Clade: Pancrustacea
- Class: Insecta
- Order: Hymenoptera
- Family: Vespidae
- Genus: Dolichovespula
- Species: D. pacifica
- Subspecies: D. p. xanthicincta

Trinomial name
- Dolichovespula pacifica xanthicincta Archer 1980

Synonyms
- Dolichovespula pacifica subsp. xanthicincta; Dolichovespula pacifica infrasp. xanthicincta

Subspecies of wasp

Dolichovespula pacifica xanthicincta is a subspecies of the wasp Dolichovespula pacifica. It has yellow markings instead of white.

== Distribution ==
North Burma, Tibet, Tibet-China Border
