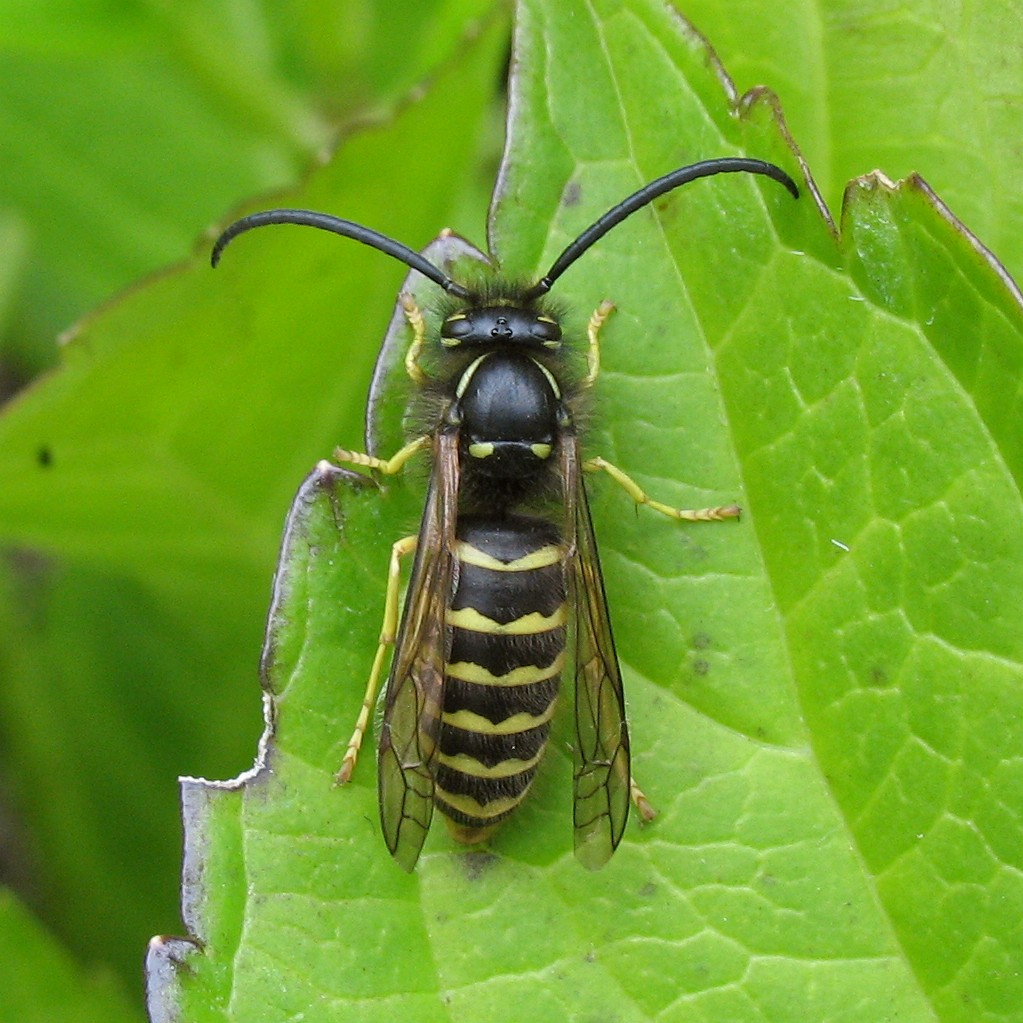

Scientific classification
- Kingdom: Animalia
- Phylum: Arthropoda
- Clade: Pancrustacea
- Class: Insecta
- Order: Hymenoptera
- Family: Vespidae
- Genus: Dolichovespula
- Species: D. arenaria

Binomial name
- Dolichovespula arenaria (Fabricius, 1775)

= Dolichovespula arenaria =

Species of wasp

Dolichovespula arenaria, also known as the common aerial yellowjacket (common aerial yellow jacket), sandhills hornet, and common yellow hornet, is a species of wasp within the genus Dolichovespula widely distributed in the North American continent.

== Taxonomy ==
The genus Dolichovespula is in the family Vespidae. In North America, the genus is referred to as yellowjackets. Worldwide, the genus has 18 species, including D. arenaria and other species such as D. albida, D. alpicola, D. saxonica, and D. maculata.

== Description and identification ==
D. arenaria can be identified by the medially interrupted or incised apical fasciae of terga 1 and 2. They are yellow in color and can be differentiated from the other yellow-colored wasps, such as D. adulterina, in its genus by the lack of black markings in the ocular sinus. In the majority of the population, the ocular sinus is yellow, but some melanic males have a black area that reaches the lower margin of the sinus. The queen has large black discal spots on terga 4 and 5, and smaller ones on terga 2 and 3. Males can be identified by the larger antenna, spots on their basal band on terga 4 and 5 as well as an abdomen that ends with a flat "fuzzy butt" instead of a pointed stinger. Nest size ranges from 1-6 combs, and are made out of dull grey paper. However, color variations do occasionally occur due to available materials.

== Distribution and habitat ==
The common aerial yellowjacket lives across Canada and the United States. It occurs from northcentral Alaska to as far south as New Mexico and Arizona. D. arenaria is in fact one of the most common aerial yellowjackets found in eastern North America, and nests can be found in arboreal to subterranean habitats. Its nests are made from paper-like material and are usually found in trees and shrubs. In urban settings, nests are frequently found on buildings.

== Colony cycle ==
A queen initiates a colony in the spring by choosing a site and building a small paper nest where it lays its eggs. Then, the eggs hatch from the brood cell and the queen feeds the larvae. These larvae eventually become workers and the colony continues to grow and peaks in the summer. The workers are morphologically distinct from the queen. The single queen heads the annual nests by producing workers. In the Dolichovespula genus, male (drone) production by workers is common and there exists high worker relatedness due to low effective paternity within nests. In general, these colonies flourish for roughly a year before they dwindle as the winter sets in.

== Interaction with other species ==
=== Predators ===
Because yellow hornets generally locate their nests high in trees, their primary predators are fairly limited to birds and occasionally other wasps. Also, many mammals take the opportunity to go after an ill-placed nest to eat the nutrient-rich larvae. These would include skunks, opossums, raccoons, and bears.

=== Diet ===
D. arenaria workers are known to mostly prey on live arthropods of a wide variety such as grasshoppers, crickets, caterpillars, spiders, flies, lacewings, and even lady beetles (which are generally avoided by Vespula species). They also prey on larvae of the fall webworm, as well as young hummingbirds. In general, they are not attracted to protein baits. Occasionally, however, Dolichovespula spp. may feed on animal carcasses— such feeding has been observed on carcasses of a dog, pig, and snake. They are commonly seen to prey in higher trees (2–4 m).

=== Defense ===
In general, smaller colonies are seen as less aggressive than larger ones. Observations of D. arenaria’s personality differ, one stating that they are quarrelsome and then other arguing that they are not, but this difference may lie in the fact that the first observation was observing the behavior when approaching a D. arenaria nest, whereas the other was describing the behavior of workers away from their nest individually. Smaller colonies’ colony defense behaviors are said to be unpredictable and erratic.

==== Venom spraying ====
Unique to D. arenaria is the observed spraying of venom out of their stings that has been seen from workers in large colonies. The "spray sting type", the term given to the venom-ejecting mechanism of these wasps, involves the contraction of the venom reservoir muscles. This venom spraying mechanism allows for a greater release of alarm pheromone in the venom, which is key to elicit the attack behavior of yellowjackets.

=== Parasites ===
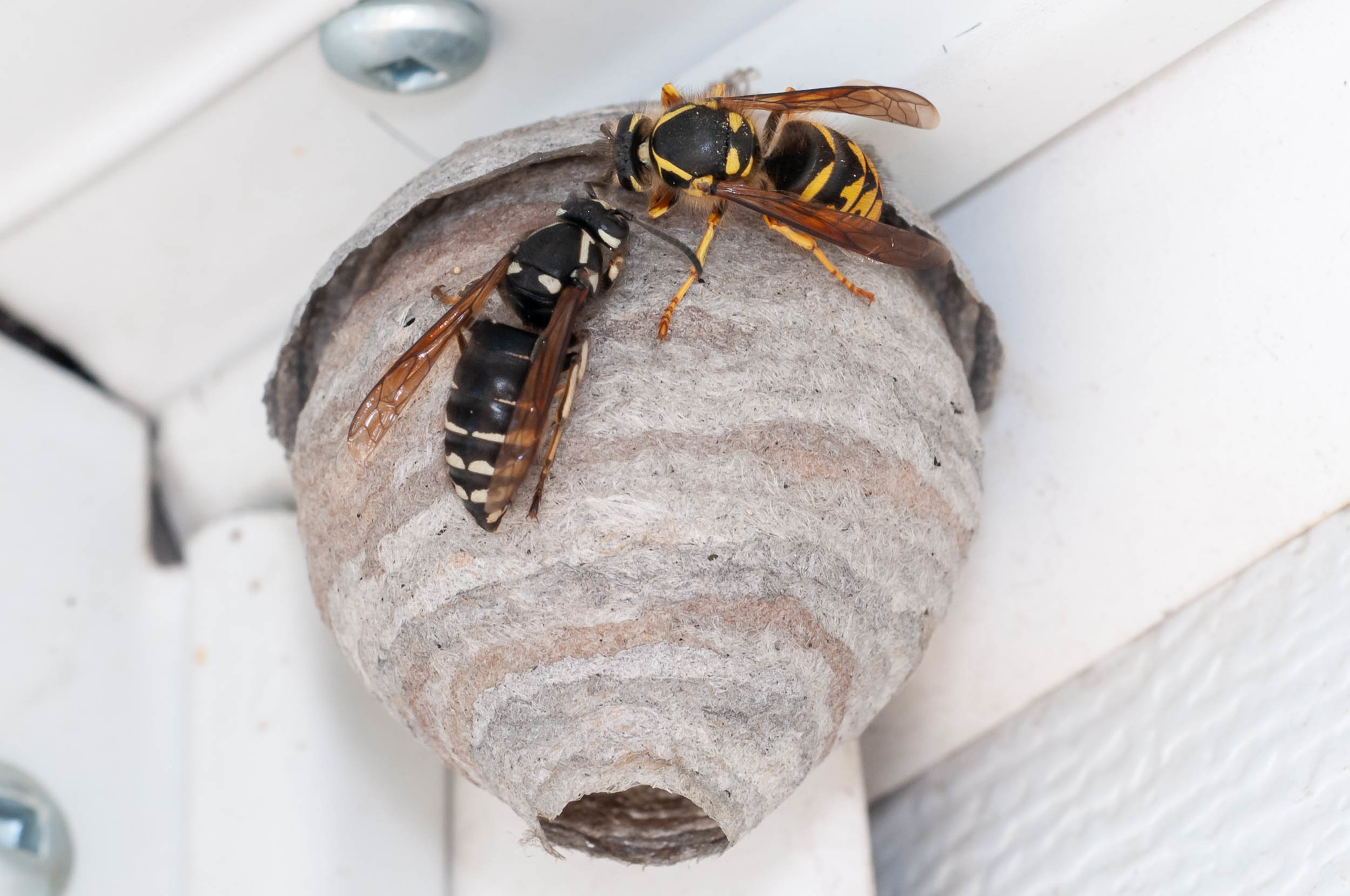
D. arenaria with a parasitic D. arctica

The two common parasites of D. arenaria nests are Sphecophaga vesparum burra, an ichneumonid, and D. arctica, a vespid social parasite.

Female bee moths (Aphomia sociella) have also been known to lay their eggs in D. arenaria nests. The hatched larvae then proceed to feed on the eggs, larvae, and pupae left unprotected by the yellowjackets, sometimes destroying large parts of the nest as they tunnel throughout looking for food.

==== D. arctica ====
D. arctica is not well known, and has historically been confused with Dolichovespula adulterina, a palearctic species. These wasps are inquilines, and rely on the workers of their host nests to rear offspring since they do not have their own worker caste. The parasite kills the foundress queen before the production of her workers is complete and takes over the nest. The lifespan of the parasite after the host queen's death is limited.

==== Sphecophaga vesparum burra ====
The rates of S. v. burra parasitism are low and their existence within the nest does not appear to hinder colony development. In this aspect, D. arenaria is unique among Dolichovespula spp. studied.

== See also ==
- Yellowjacket
