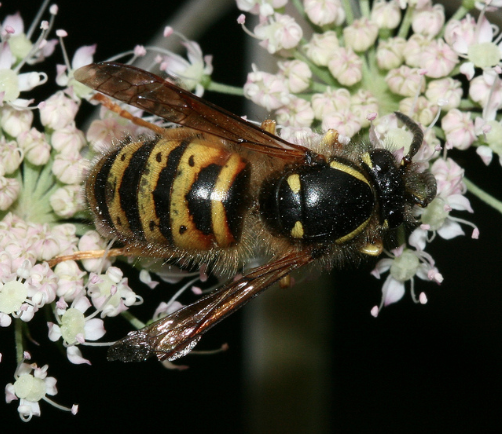

Scientific classification
- Kingdom: Animalia
- Phylum: Arthropoda
- Clade: Pancrustacea
- Class: Insecta
- Order: Hymenoptera
- Family: Vespidae
- Genus: Dolichovespula
- Species: D. norwegica

Binomial name
- Dolichovespula norwegica (Fabricius, 1781)

= Dolichovespula norwegica =

Norwegian wasp

Species of wasp

The Norwegian wasp (Dolichovespula norwegica) is a species of eusocial wasp. It is common in Scandinavia and can also be found in Scotland and other areas in Britain and Ireland. Often known for being a tree wasp, it nests in low branches and bushes and feeds on insects. It also obtains nectar from blueberry and snowberry flowers. Although D. norwegica is rarely considered a pest in the past, a few cases of pest problems relating to them have been reported. The species is not endangered.

== Taxonomy and phylogeny ==
D. norwegica is placed in the family Vespidae and the genus Dolichovespula. Based on recent studies on mitochondrial genes, Dolichovespula and Vespula are monophyletic, meaning they descended from common ancestors. Two species groups, maculata and norwegica, form the Dolichovespula clade. While the maculata has physical attributes such as pronotal striae, emarginated apices of the seventh metasomal sternum in males, and aedeagal medial lobes, D. norwegica females have long oculomalar space and lateroanterior clypeal angles with less prominent semicircular projections.

In the past, D. norwegica and D. albida, the Arctic yellowjacket from northern North America, were considered to be the same species, but studies in 2011 of the male genitalia show that they are not conspecific. Often, male genitalia are used to characterise the Nearctic and Palearctic forms of D. norwegica.

== Description and identification ==
The Norwegian wasp has eye-catching black and yellow colour patterns over its body. Starting from the face, it has a long malar space and is separated by a black bar that runs vertically. The sides of its thorax contain small black hairs that project outwards, and the rear has distinct yellow spots. One can often see red colouring on the front of the abdomen. Dolichovespula is derived from the Greek word, dolichos, which means long. Its genus name matches with physical characteristics. The typical length of an individual of this species is 11– 18 mm. Compared to D. maculata, whose adults range from 2o–3o mm, queens are generally around 17 mm and workers are smaller, around 13 mm

== Nests ==
D. norwegica nests have a loose, coarse-woven texture, which suggests that the species is terrestrial. One such nest was found, spherical in size, about 10.5 cm long, 10.5 cm at its widest point, and 15 cm off the ground. This nest was fastened from the top of a willow branch and was further stabilised by a side branch attachment. The nest consisted of 11 envelope layers with a few extra layers on the edge of the top comb. The texture of each layer was rough with some holes from weaving.

Some fibres were fine and grey, while some were coarse and straw-coloured. Occasionally, black- and rust-coloured fibers are seen, as well. The most common source of nest fibres is weathered wood. On the outer layer of the nest, leaves of broadleaf plants were also observed.

The observed nest had three combs and 357 cells. From close observations, the worker cells in comb one were an average of 5.17 mm, while the reproductive cells in combs two and three had an average of 6.33 mm. Nests of D. norwegica in Europe were reported to have a maximum of 1,400 cells.

Overall, nests of D. norwegica wasps are commonly found on tree branches, bushes, walls of houses, and even cavities in the ground. This wasp species apparently prefers to build nests in rural areas.

== Distribution and habitat ==
Norwegian wasps typically construct their nests on tree branches or bushes, often selecting areas that are closed rather than exposed, such as moors. Despite its common name, D. norwegica is also found throughout England, Ireland, and commonly in Scotland.

Since nests are of a coarse, woven texture with a few holes, they are detracted from thermoregulation. Furthermore, nests are also less durable, so must be built in protected areas.

== Colony cycle ==
D. norwegica queens and males leave their home colonies around late summer, when the queens are fertilised and pass the winter by finding an overwintering site. Before spring arrives, D. norwegica males die. Upon arrival of spring (around mid-April or early May), the queens emerge and feed, with the goal of finding a new nest location.

First, the queen starts building her nest, and rears workers in the first cells (average diameter of 4.5 mm). The workers then replace the queen in the nest and assume brood-rearing activities. Later cells, where queens and males are reared, on average are 5.5 mm in diameter. By June, nests have about 50 workers, and by the end of July, about 300 workers. After this period, however, the number of workers declines rapidly. The largest number of workers in a colony ever reported was 363, while other colonies had around 150 workers. A typical colony produced 1471 wasps (measure from 14 colonies with large cells), and of that total, 43% were queens and 57% were drones.

The colony cycle of D. norwegica is short; this species has a tendency to start in the spring. Their strategy is known as summer-advantage strategy, which is distinctive of the Dolichovespula genus. Such a strategy is implemented and used to take advantage of the short, yet favorable conditions of the summer. Most colonies die out after mid-August and a few last until early September. The typical number of days a colony exists is 95–115.

== Behavior ==
=== Mating ===
D. norwegica, as is common among social wasps, mating commonly occurs during the warm season. Males tend to occupy a dense area on trees and shrubs, and perform nuptial flights. They swarm in groups. D. norwegica males and a few workers have been found with on a rocky summit in Scotland in groups.

== Kin selection ==
As in related wasps, the queen mating frequency and sperm use both influence paternity, which is important for influencing colony kin structure and reproductive tendencies of the colony. In D. norwegica colonies, male paternity is low compared to Vespula. This leads to worker-queen conflict over male production. Of five species of the genus Dolichovespula studied, D. norwegica has the second-lowest value for effective paternity (1.08). Worker-worker relatedness is high among D. norwegica with a value of 0.71.

=== Genetic relatedness within colonies ===
Since the effective mating frequency of D. norwegica queens is low, worker-worker relatedness is higher than worker–queen relatedness. Genetically speaking, this means that each worker is more related to other workers' sons than the queen's sons, creating worker-queen conflict over reproduction.

In one colony of D. norwegica, two matrilines were found, suggesting that the nest was once taken over by another queen. This is intriguing because it is the first case in Dolichovespula.

=== Worker–queen conflict ===
Several examples of worker-queen conflict exist among members of D. norwegica. Few workers were detected to have full ovary activation and were producing males. Ovary activation is most likely due to the absence of the queen. Workers may kill off their queens so they can reproduce; no queens were found on collection of 12 of 14 D. norwegica nests. Queens are often recognizable due to their heavily worn wings. Matricide is common after workers are reared and queens have laid their eggs in annual colonies with low paternity.

Despite possibilities of matricide and ovary activations, workers produce very few males. Worker policing over eggs is also seen where workers choose to keep queen-laid eggs and remove worker-laid eggs. Workers are unlikely to reproduce because it is too costly; worker reproduction can reduce colony productivity and/or obstruct reproduction of females in the colony. Furthermore, very few workers have active ovaries.

==== Worker policing ====
Three general forms of egg policing are found to conclusively contribute to reproduction ratios of D. norwegica. All three forms target worker-laid eggs over queen-laid eggs. Two forms that are probably most influential of policing are worker policing and selfish policing. Despite being more related to other workers' sons, worker-laid eggs were consumed by other workers. About two-thirds of those workers were reproductive workers. Occasionally, these workers replaced the egg with one of their own (in 31% of the cases were due to self policing). Workers never removed their own eggs, and if a nonreproductive worker removed a worker-laid egg, then the queen would replace it with her own egg.

Furthermore, an important part of worker policing among D. norwegica is specialisation. Evidence for specialisation in policing was found when observed number of policing workers was lower than the estimated true number of policing workers. An estimated average of 14 workers specialised in policing (a fourth of the total work force).

==== Queen policing ====
The last form is queen policing of eggs. About 32% of policing over worker-laid eggs was done by the queen. Two cases are known where queen-laid eggs were eaten; in one, if a reproductive worker eats the egg, then it will replace it with its own egg, and if a nonreproductive worker eats the egg, then the queen always lays the replacement. These situations were less common and only occurred 8% of the time. Queen policing is popular in colonies that are small and of low paternity. Relatively smaller colonies are better because the queen can monitor and control her workers.

== Interaction with other species ==
=== Diet ===
D. norwegica larvae commonly feed on flies, other insects, and spiders that are brought to them and chewed up by the adult wasps to a paste form. The adult individuals feed on nectar from Angelica sylvestris, Heracleum spondylium, and Chamerion angsutifolium. They generally prefer a sweeter taste. Larvae of D. norwegica have a single tooth, used to feed on the paste. Once it feeds, the larva expels a sweet liquid, which the adult wasp consumes. D. norwegica also consumes flowers of umbellifers such as the wild parsnip.

=== Parasites ===
Norwegian wasps are known to be a host for Dolichovespula adulterina, which is also a known social parasite of D. saxonica. However, Dlichovespula adulterina also uses D. norwegica as another host. One suggestion for this inquiline interaction between D. adulterina and D. norwegica is that D. adulterina has been found to cohabitate with D. norwegica. The two species were found to occupy the same space in northern Norway, where no D. saxonica wasps were to be found nearby.

Furthermore, in a few nests of D. norwegica, D. norwegica workers lived with a queen from D. adulterina. Other accounts report as many as 46 queens and 24 males of D. adulterina in a nest of D. norwegica. Another case observed two unemerged males of D. norwegica and one unemerged male of D. adulterina from the nest.

Also, cases have been observed of D. norwegica displaying parasitic behavior on D. sylvestris. Moreover, D. norwegica shows aggression towards individuals of D. sylvestris. Evidence of damaged legs and wings of D. sylvestris were found.

== Human importance ==
D. norwegica wasps previously were rarely considered to be pests. They build their nests far from human activity, and rarely visited buildings, picnics, and fruits. However, if their nests were built on a hedge, low eaves, or close to humans, removing the nests was needed. Although they are less aggressive than other wasps in Vespula, individuals of D. norwegica protect their nest with their stingers.

More recently, more cases of pest problems relating to D. norwegica have been reported. Although they can be annoying in some cases, their predation activity on other arthropods makes them valuable allies of farmers. Their role in the pollination of wild plants is also of great importance for the protection of biodiversity.
