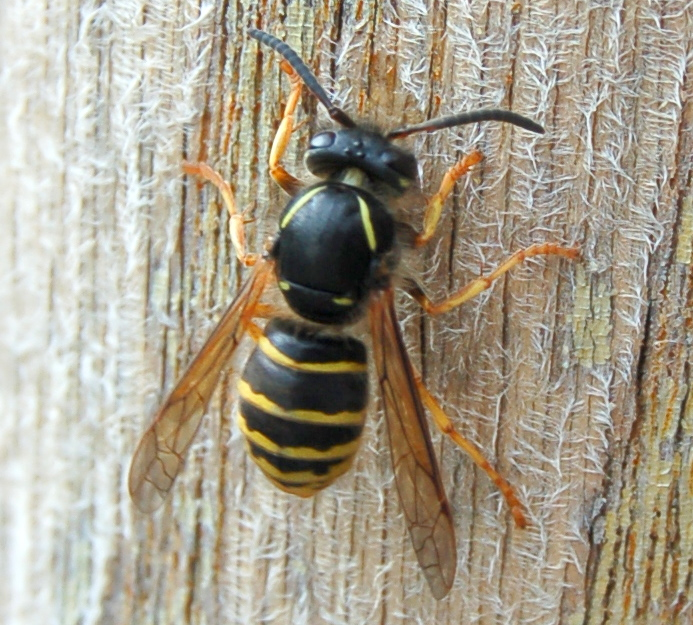

Scientific classification
- Kingdom: Animalia
- Phylum: Arthropoda
- Clade: Pancrustacea
- Class: Insecta
- Order: Hymenoptera
- Family: Vespidae
- Genus: Dolichovespula
- Species: D. norvegicoides

Binomial name
- Dolichovespula norvegicoides (Sladen, 1918)

= Dolichovespula norvegicoides =

Species of wasp

Dolichovespula norvegicoides is a species of social wasp occurring from Central California, to Canada, and Alaska.
