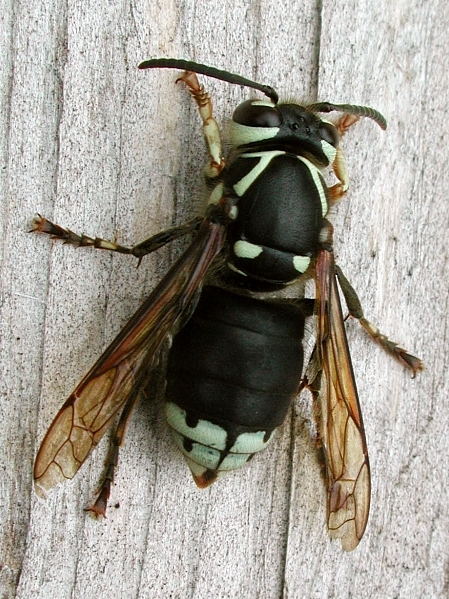
- Dolichovespula maculata

Scientific classification
- Kingdom: Animalia
- Phylum: Arthropoda
- Clade: Pancrustacea
- Class: Insecta
- Order: Hymenoptera
- Family: Vespidae
- Subfamily: Vespinae
- Genus: Dolichovespula; Rohwer, 1916

Type species
- Vespa maculata Linnaeus, 1763

Subgenera
- Dolichovespula Rohwer, 1916; Boreovespula Blüthgen, 1943; Metavespula Blüthgen, 1943; Pseudovespula Bischoff, 1931

= Dolichovespula =

Genus of wasps

Dolichovespula is a small genus of social wasps distributed widely throughout the Northern Hemisphere. The yellow and black members of the genus are known by the common name yellowjackets in North America, such as Dolichovespula norwegica, along with members of their sister genus Vespula. In a study on the nesting biology of Dolichovespula, a colony of D. maculata with 771 workers was reported as having the largest recorded population count.

== Overview ==
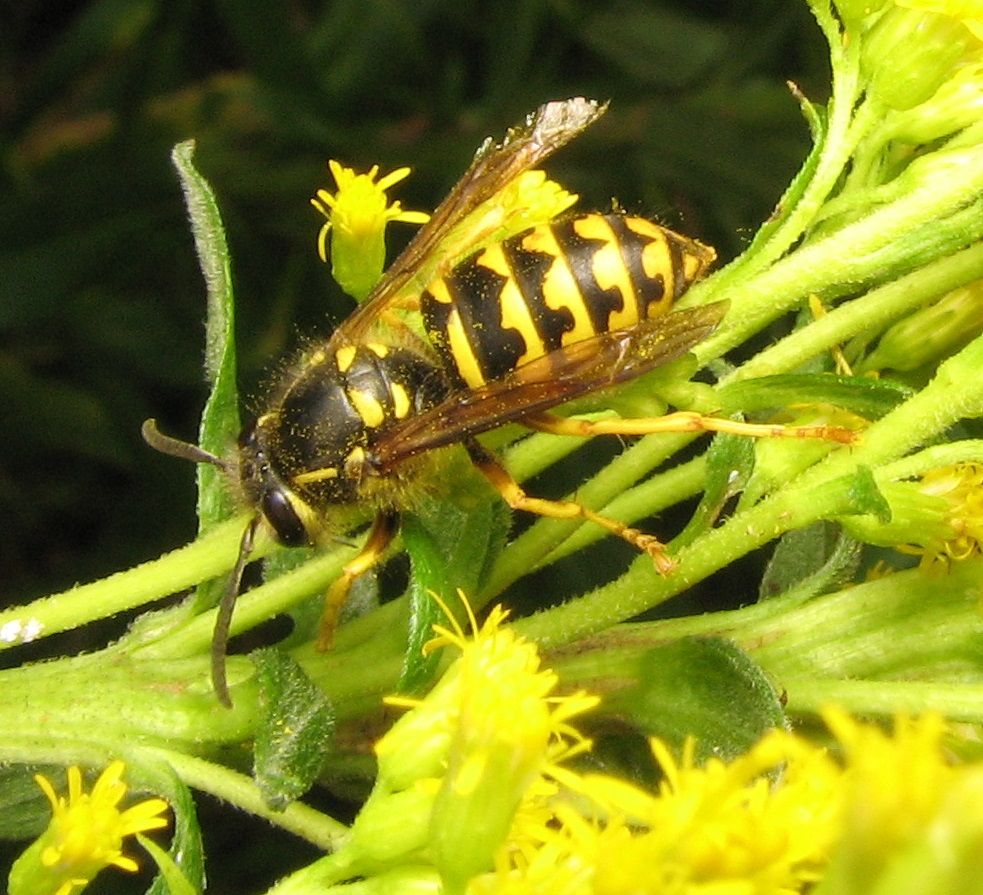
D. arenaria on goldenrod

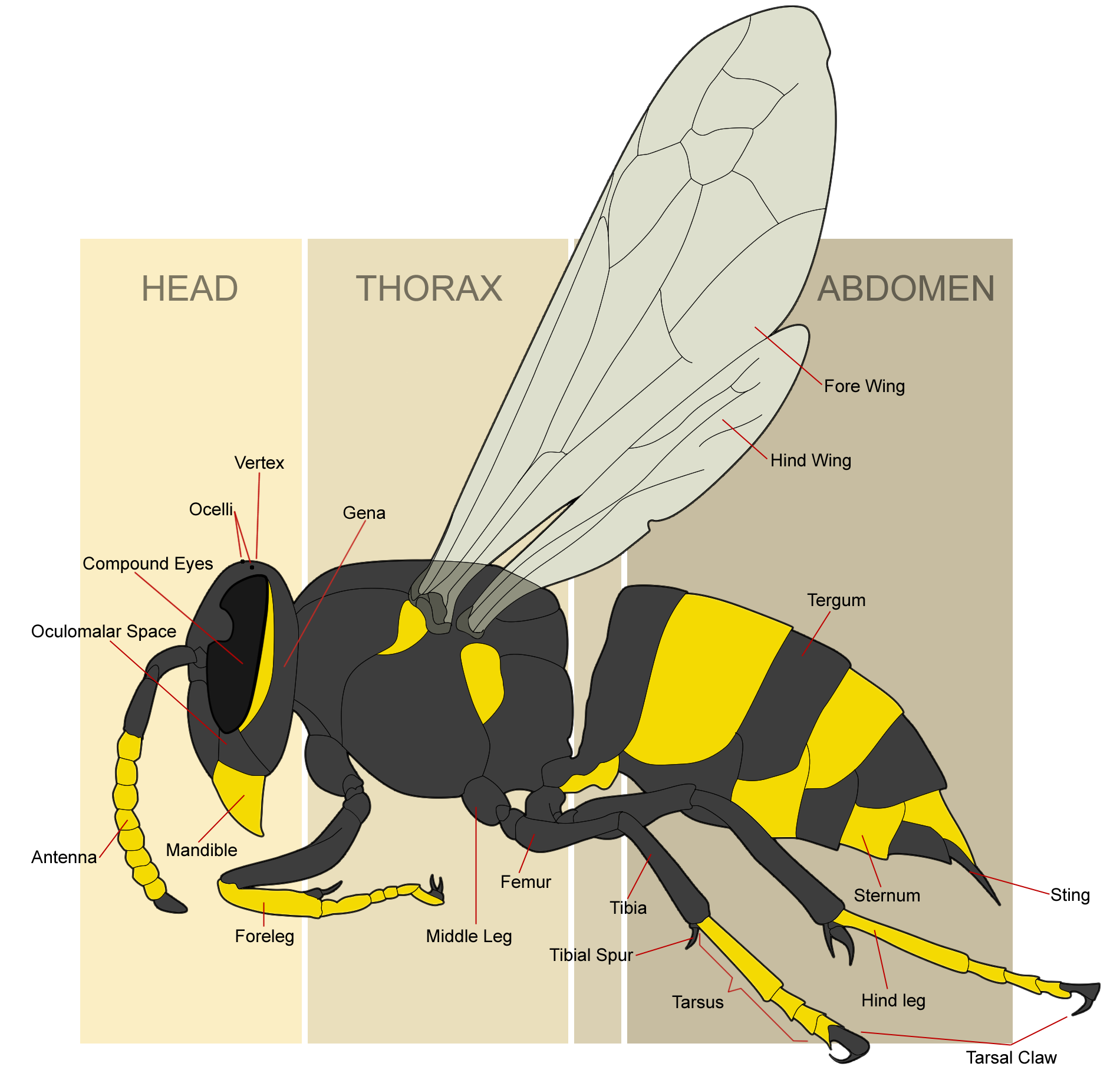
Wasp morphology: the oculo-malar space

Several morphological differences distinguish them from Vespula. The most noticeable is the long face (dolikhos = "long" in Greek). Viewed from the front, Dolichovespula faces are long, while Vespula faces are short and round. The oculomalar space, the distance between the eye and the mandible, is long in Dolichovespula and short in Vespula. Dolichovespula nests are usually aerial, while Vespula spp. often nest underground or in cavities such as wall voids.

== Reproduction ==
All females are born with reproductive capacities. Dolichovespula is different from its sister group Vespula in that some of the workers create haploid offspring that develop into males.

== Species and subspecies ==
These species/subspecies are recognised:

- Dolichovespula adulterina (Buysson, 1905) – parasitic yellowjacket
- Dolichovespula adulterina montivaga Sk. Yamane, 1982 – parasitic yellowjacket (subspecies of D. adulterina)
- Dolichovespula alpicola Eck 1984 – Rocky Mountain aerial yellowjacket
- Dolichovespula arctica Rohwer 1916 – parasitic yellowjacket (not a subspecies of D. adulterina)
- Dolichovespula arenaria (Fabricius, 1775) – aerial yellowjacket
- Dolichovespula asiatica Archer, 1981
- Dolichovespula baileyi Archer, 1987
- Dolichovespula carolina (Linnaeus, 1767)
- Dolichovespula flora Archer, 1987
- Dolichovespula kuami Kim, 1996
- Dolichovespula lama (Buysson, 1903)
- Dolichovespula maculata (Linnaeus, 1763) – bald-faced hornet
- Dolichovespula media (Retz., 1783) – median wasp
- Dolichovespula norvegicoides (Sladen, 1918) – northern aerial yellowjacket
- Dolichovespula norwegica (Fabricius 1781) – Norwegian wasp
- Dolichovespula omissa (Bischoff, 1931) – parasitic yellowjacket
- Dolichovespula pacifica (Birula, 1930)
- Dolichovespula panda Archer, 1980
- Dolichovespula saxonica (Fabricius, 1793) – Saxon wasp
- Dolichovespula stigma Lee 1986
- Dolichovespula sylvestris (Scopoli, 1763) – tree wasp
- Dolichovespula sylvestris sumptuosa (Buysson, 1905) (subspecies of D. sylvestris)
- Dolichovespula xanthicincta Archer, 1980
