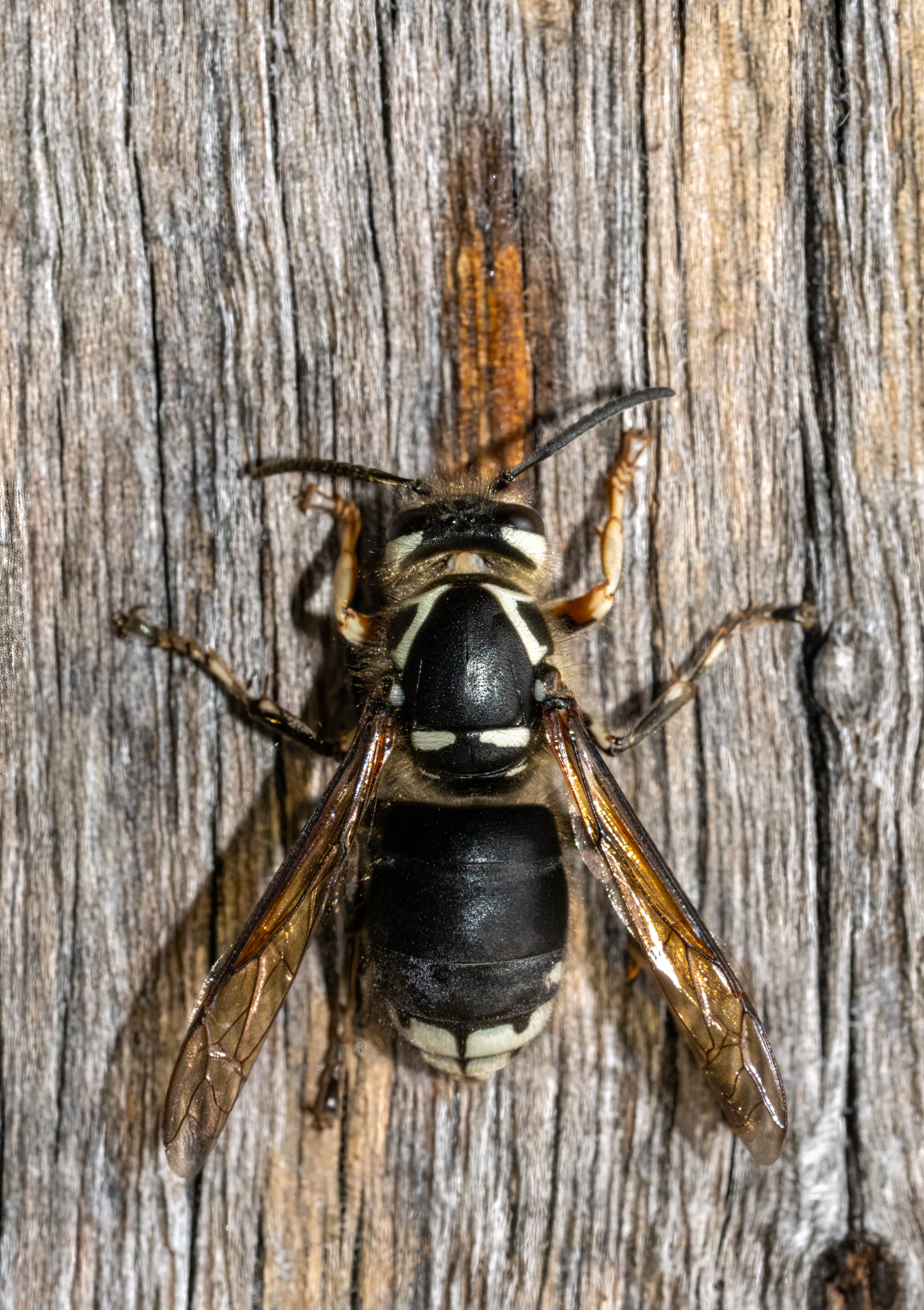

Scientific classification
- Kingdom: Animalia
- Phylum: Arthropoda
- Clade: Pancrustacea
- Class: Insecta
- Order: Hymenoptera
- Family: Vespidae
- Subfamily: Vespinae
- Genus: Dolichovespula
- Species: D. maculata

Binomial name
- Dolichovespula maculata (Linnaeus, 1763)

Synonyms
- Vespa maculata

= Dolichovespula maculata =

Bald-faced hornet

Species of wasp

Dolichovespula maculata is a species of wasp in the genus Dolichovespula and a member of the eusocial, cosmopolitan family Vespidae. It is taxonomically an aerial yellowjacket but is known by many colloquial names, primarily bald-faced hornet, but also including bald-faced aerial yellowjacket, bald-faced wasp, bald hornet, white-faced hornet, blackjacket, white-tailed hornet, spruce wasp, naked brink, and bull wasp. Technically a species of yellowjacket wasp, it is not one of the true hornets, which are in the genus Vespa. Colonies contain 400 to 700 workers, the largest recorded colony size in its genus, Dolichovespula. It builds a characteristic large hanging paper nest up to 58 cm (23 in) in length. Workers aggressively defend their nest by repeatedly stinging invaders.

The bald-faced hornet is distributed throughout the United States and Canada, but is most common in the Southeastern United States. Males in this species are haploid and females are diploid. Worker females can, therefore, lay eggs that develop into males.

== Taxonomy and phylogenetics ==
The bald-faced hornet gets its name from the characteristic white markings on its face, as the word "bald" in English is derived from the word "piebald". It was first described by Carl Linnaeus in his 1763 Centuria Insectorum. D. maculata is part of the cosmopolitan family Vespidae, in the genus Dolichovespula. Its black and white coloring differentiates it from its mostly black and yellow congenerics.

== Description ==
The bald-faced hornet is distinguished from other yellowjackets by its striking black-and-white coloring. It has a white or "bald-faced" head, which is the source of its colloquial name. This wasp also has three white stripes at the end of its body and is notably larger than other species of Dolichovespula, as adults average about 19 mm (0.75 in) in length. Queen and worker wasps have similar morphologies. Queens are always larger than workers in their colonies, though size distributions can vary in different nests, and workers in one colony might be as large as a queen in a different one.

D. maculata creates egg-shaped, paper nests up to 360 mm (14 in) in diameter and 580 mm (23 in) in length. Nests are layered hexagonal combs covered by a mottled gray paper envelope. Bald-faced hornets create this paper envelope by collecting and chewing naturally occurring fibers. The wood fiber mixes with their saliva to become a pulpy substance that they can then form into place.

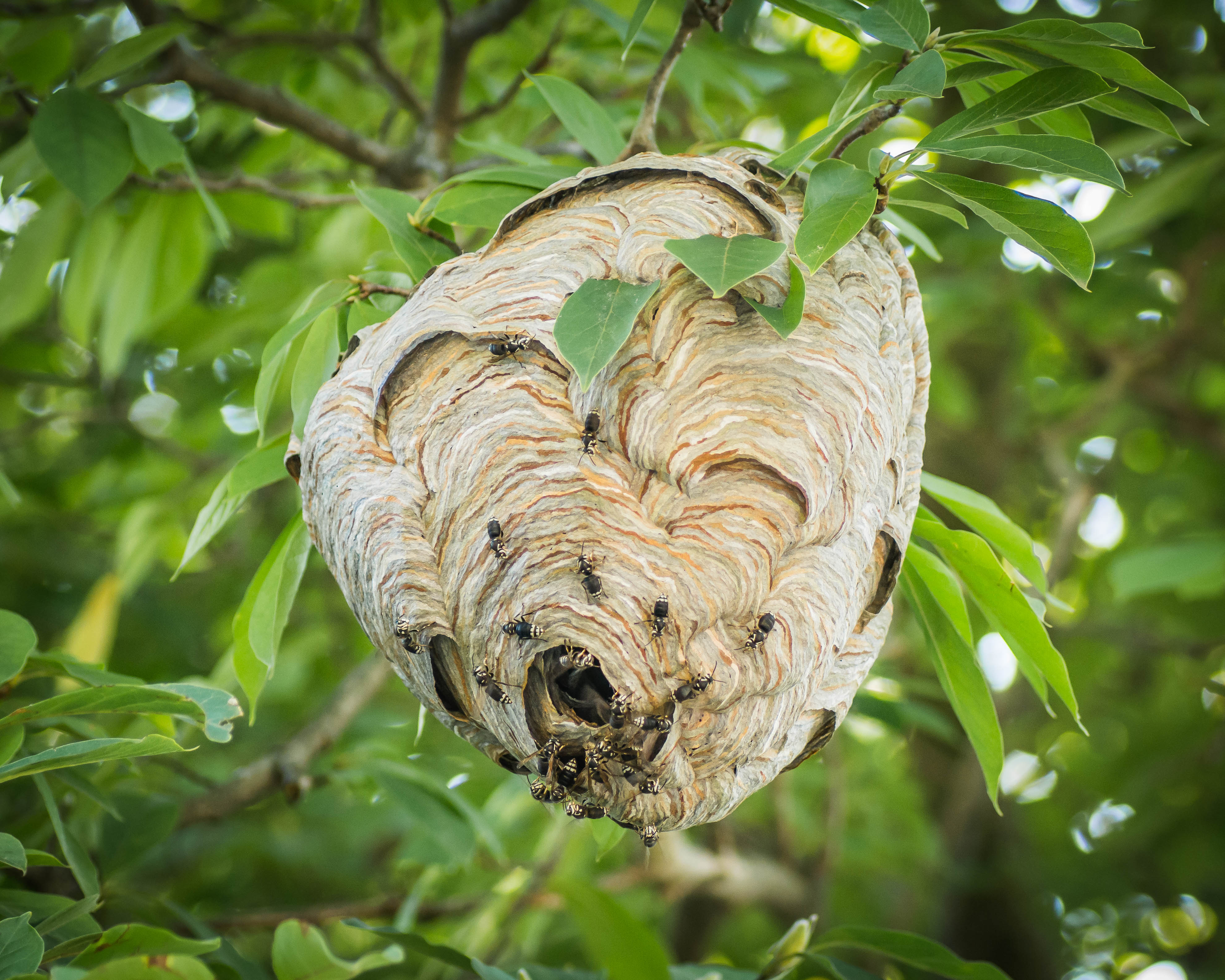
Nest attached to a tree branch

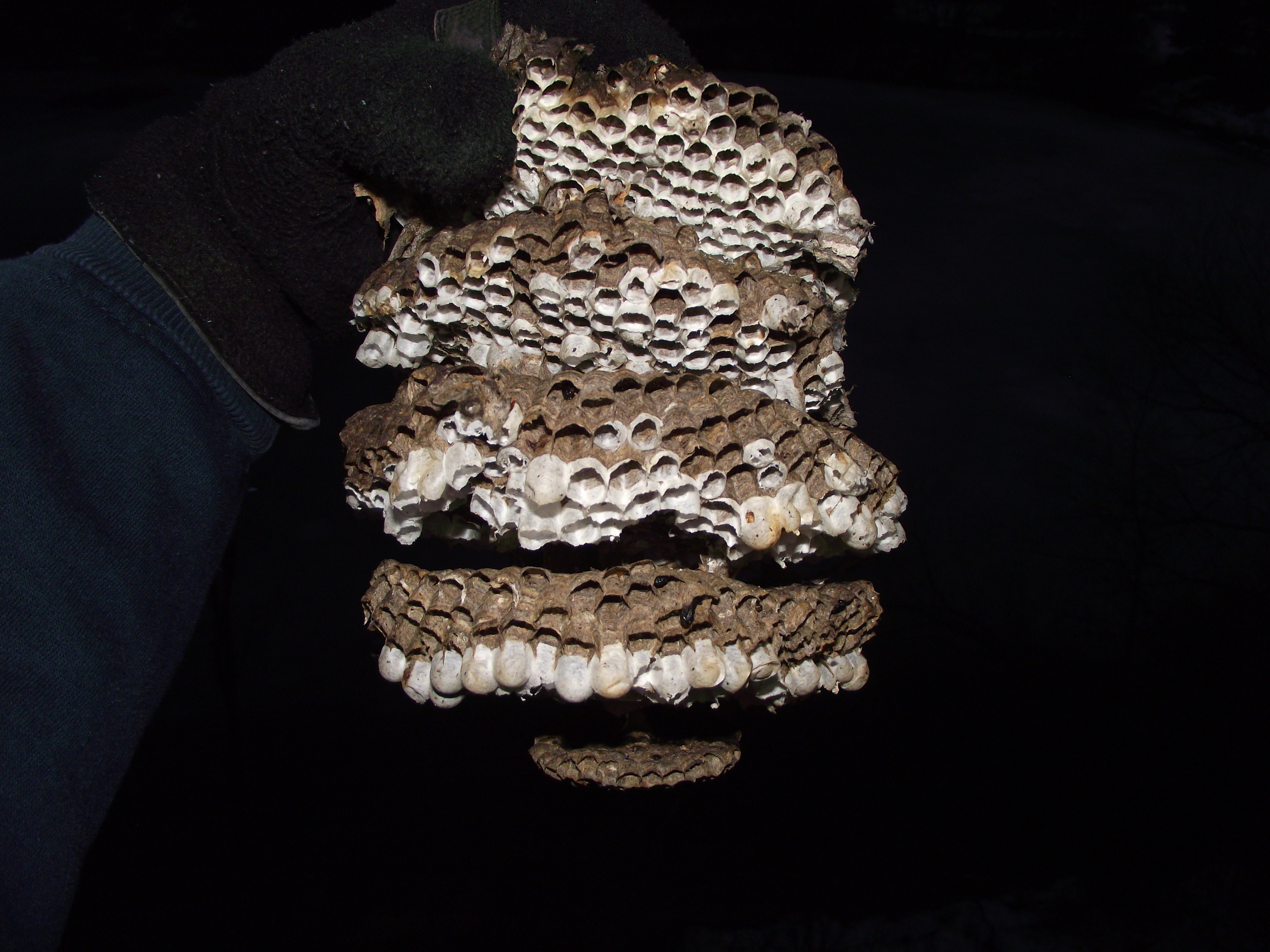
Inside the paper covering of a bald-faced hornet nest are several suspended combs containing chambers for larvae.

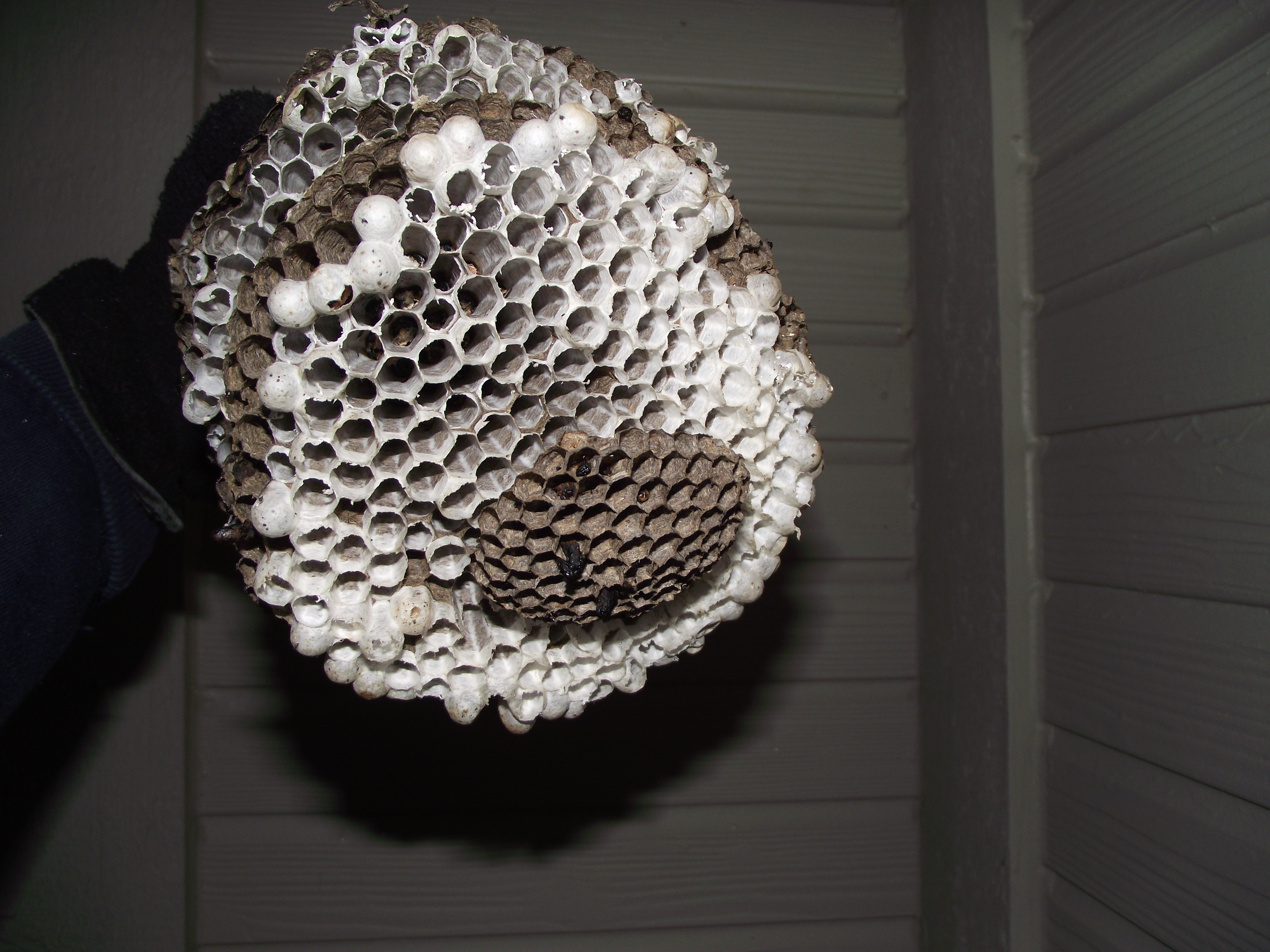
This view, with paper outer wall removed, shows the final, small comb that hangs at the bottom.

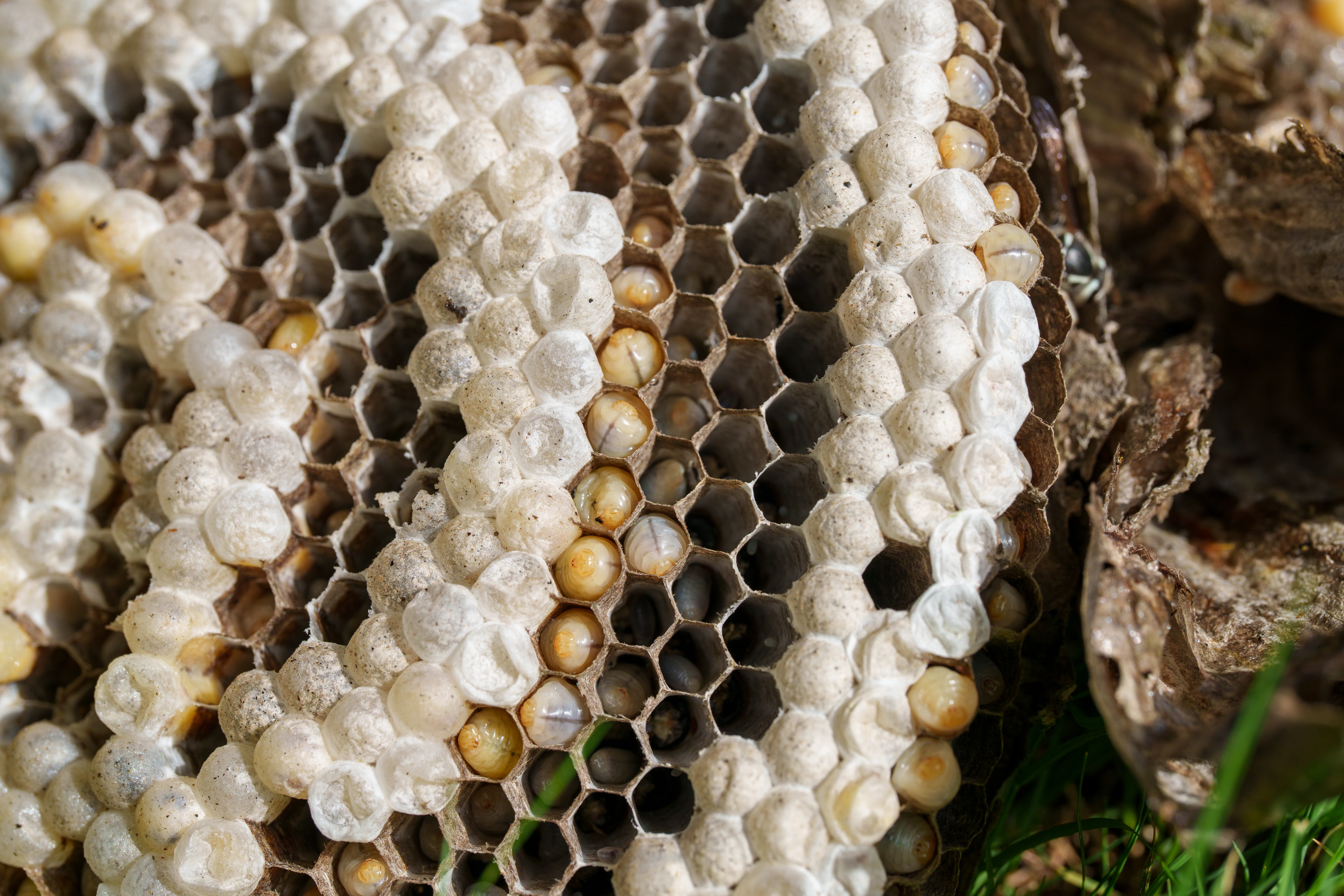
Macro of larvae in nest.

== Distribution ==
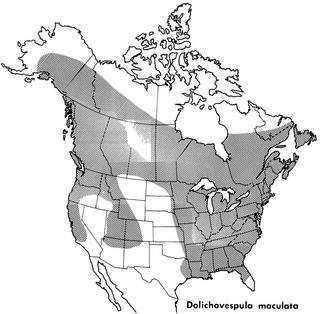
Dolichovespula maculata distribution

The bald-faced hornet lives in North America, including Canada, the Rocky Mountains, the western coast of the United States, and most of the eastern United States. It is most common in the Southeastern United States.

D. maculata is found in forested areas and in vegetation in urban areas. Nests are generally located in trees and bushes, but occasionally are found under rock overhangs or the sides of buildings. Vertical distribution of nests has been recorded from heights of 0.3 to 20 m (1 ft 0 in to 65 ft 7 in) above ground level.

== Behavior ==
Bald-faced hornets are omnivorous, and considered to be beneficial due to their predation of flies, caterpillars, and spiders. Their aggressive defensive nature, though, makes them a threat to humans who wander too close to a nest or when a nest is constructed too close to human habitation. They vigorously defend the nest, with workers stinging repeatedly, as is common among social bees and wasps. The bald-faced hornet has a unique defense in that it can squirt or spray venom from the stinger into the eyes of vertebrate nest intruders. The venom causes immediate watering of the eyes and temporary blindness.

== Colony cycle ==
The life cycle of a colony can be divided into the founding stage, the ergonomic stage, and the reproductive stage. Colonies show annual cycling. New nests are generally founded during spring and early summer by a single queen, though temporal specifics vary depending on location. In Washington, nest initiation occurs during mid-May, and workers emerge during mid-June. Large-cell building starts during mid-July, and the first queens emerge during mid-August. The colony terminates during mid-September, for a life cycle around 4 months (122 days). Lower latitudes correlate with longer life cycles. In Indiana, colonies have been observed to begin in early May and terminate in late September, a life cycle of 5 months (153 days), and in Central California, nests are initiated as early as the end of March. These nests survive between 155 and 170 days. Active colonies have been observed in central Pennsylvania as late as mid-October. On October 28, 2022, an active colony was encountered on the Middle Fork Willamette River in western Oregon.

=== Founding stage ===
The colony is founded by a single overwintered, inseminated queen. She rears the first generation of workers on her own until they are functional. Colonies pass through the foundation over a typical period of 23–24 days. After the queen lays her eggs, 6 days are needed for them to hatch. They grow as larvae for 8 days, then an additional 9–10 days to mature into adult workers.

=== Ergonomic and reproductive stage ===
During the ergonomic stage, the colony's activities are concerned with cell building and worker production. The queen devotes herself entirely to laying eggs, while the workers take over all other necessary housekeeping tasks. Sometime before the midpoint of colony life, the colony begins to invest energy in producing reproductives, marking the transition into the reproductive stage, during which both workers and reproductives are raised. Production of both castes limits the size of the workforce, but an early switching time is highly adaptive for social-wasp colonies in limiting the risk of total loss. In a sampling of 50 colonies taken in Maryland in 1977, workers were produced from mid-April to early October, and reproductives were produced from mid-July through the end of November. Onset of male output usually precedes that of queen output in social wasps, but D. maculata is an exception.

Energy investment by workers required to produce reproductives is considerable. Newly emerged males and queens are no more functional than pupae; both depend heavily on solid prey brought in by workers, thus competing with larvae for food resources. As a result, worker quantity must remain high to maintain reproductive output. Workers must maintain food stores and defend the nest, and colonies whose work force diminishes too early in the colony's life cycle can suffer a greater overall loss in reproductives.

== Social organization ==
=== Caste structure and distribution ===
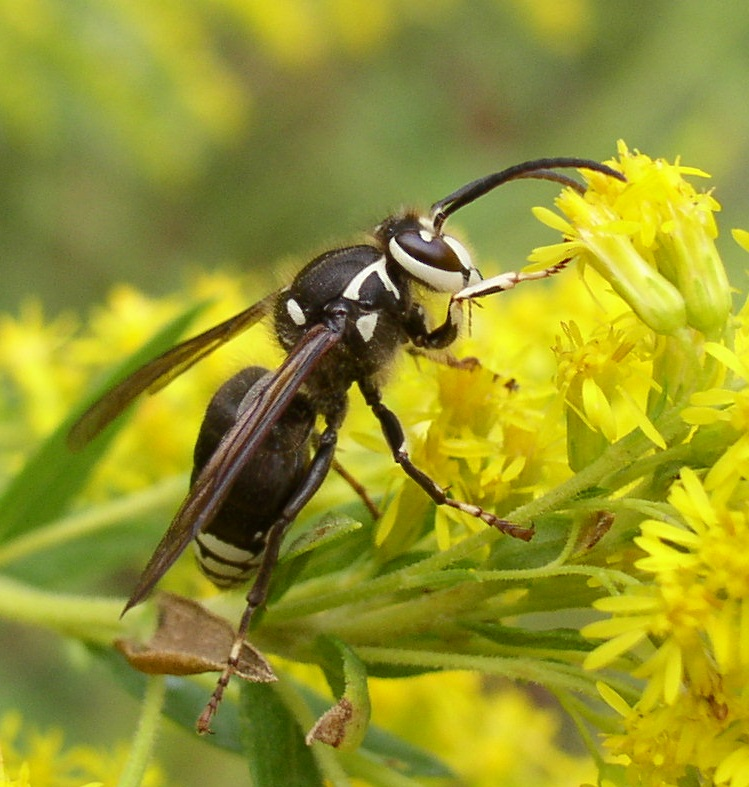
D. maculata male on goldenrod

A colony is divided into haploid males, female workers, and the queen. All females hatch with reproductive capacities. Dolichovespula differs from its sister group Vespula in that some of the workers create haploid offspring that develop into males. Caste systems are determined by larval feeding regimens. G. T. Felippotti et al examined caste distribution among females in five small-cell colonies and six large-cell colonies. Small-cell colonies had one queen and 17–21 female workers. Large-cell colonies had two to six queens and 10–52 workers. Morphological comparisons revealed that queens are always larger than workers in the same colonies.

=== Cuticular hydrocarbons ===
Cuticular hydrocarbons serve as a barrier to moisture diffusion, so prevent dehydration in wasps. Cuticular hydrocarbon profiles vary over species and nests, and they are a proposed mechanism for nest-mate recognition. Worker and queen cuticular lipids have similar components, but their distributions differ dramatically, implying that cuticular hydrocarbons also play a role in caste differentiation.

=== Cuticular hydrocarbon profile and dimorphism among castes ===
The following lipid profiles were determined from specimens collected in the summer and early fall of northeastern Georgia in 1989. The dominant hydrocarbons recovered from the cuticles of workers were n-alkanes and methyl- and dimethyl-branched alkanes with a C27 or a C29 backbone. The major lipids and their distributions in workers were: n-heptacosane (28%), 11-13-methylheptacosane (15%) 3,13-dimethylheptacosane (11%), and 13 and 15-methylnonacosane (10%). Nonacosene composed 34% of cuticular lipids in the queen. The average chain length of identified cuticular lipids is 28.0 in queens and 27.5 in workers.

== Kin selection ==
=== Kin recognition and discrimination ===
Gynes in D. maculata have the ability to discriminate between fragments of natal comb and foreign comb. Recognition does not depend upon presence of viable brood in the comb fragment. The physical nature of cues mediating natal comb recognition is unknown, though some researchers propose that distinct cuticular hydrocarbon profiles allow wasps to recognize nestmates.

=== Worker-queen conflict ===
D. maculata is characterized by low paternity, worker reproduction, and queen-worker conflict. Divergent genetic interests between workers and their queen cause intranest struggle for control, which disrupts social organization. Because of haplodiploidy, workers are unable to mate, but their unfertilized eggs become males. Workers and their queens are most related to their own sons. Natural selection then favors those workers that produce their own sons rather than rearing the queen's brood. In a sampling of seven D. maculata nests, 20.9% of males were produced by workers. The percentage of males that were workers' sons did not correlate with the time during which nests were collected or colony size. Because worker relatedness is so high in D. maculata, workers are more related to other workers' sons than to the queen's own sons, so worker policing of egg production does not occur. An explanation for the queen's near monopoly on male production is that worker production is costly, so reduces total colony reproduction. The cost toward worker production acts as a selective pressure on the workers, so they are more likely to exercise reproductive restraint.

Workers in reproductive nests may kill their queen so they can reproduce. When researchers examined a collection of 19 D. maculata nests during the reproductive phase of their life cycle, they found that 14 nests did not have a queen. Matricide might occur after sufficient workers have been raised and queen-destined eggs have been laid. However, matricide has not been directly observed and other causes of death are possible.

== Diet ==
Diet in D. maculata varies depending on an individual's life cycle stage and geographic location. Adult yellowjackets are predatory, and prey upon several insect types. They have been observed consuming meat, spiders, fruit, and insects. Adults also drink flower nectar, which they feed to their larvae.

== Parasites ==
Female bee moths (Aphomia sociella) have been known to lay their eggs in bald-faced hornet nests. The hatched larvae then proceed to feed on the eggs, larvae, and pupae left unprotected by the wasps. This infestation can destroy large parts of the nest as the larvae tunnel throughout it looking for food.

== Life cycle ==
Each spring, queens that matured and were fertilized at the end of the previous season begin new colonies. A queen selects a location for her nest, begins building it, lays a first batch of eggs, and feeds this first group of larvae. These become workers and assume the chore of expanding the nest. They chew up wood, which mixes with a starch in their saliva. They then spread it around with their mandibles and legs, and it dries into a papery structure. The workers guard the nest and feed on nectar, tree sap and fruit pulp (particularly that of apples). They also prey on insects and other arthropods, chewing them up and feeding them to the larvae. They have been known to scavenge raw meat. In late summer and early fall, the queen begins to lay eggs that become drones and new queens. After pupation, these fertile males and females fly off to mate. Fertilized queens then overwinter and start new colonies during the next year. Males and workers die in the end of the cycle. The old queen, if not killed by workers, dies with them around mid-autumn.
