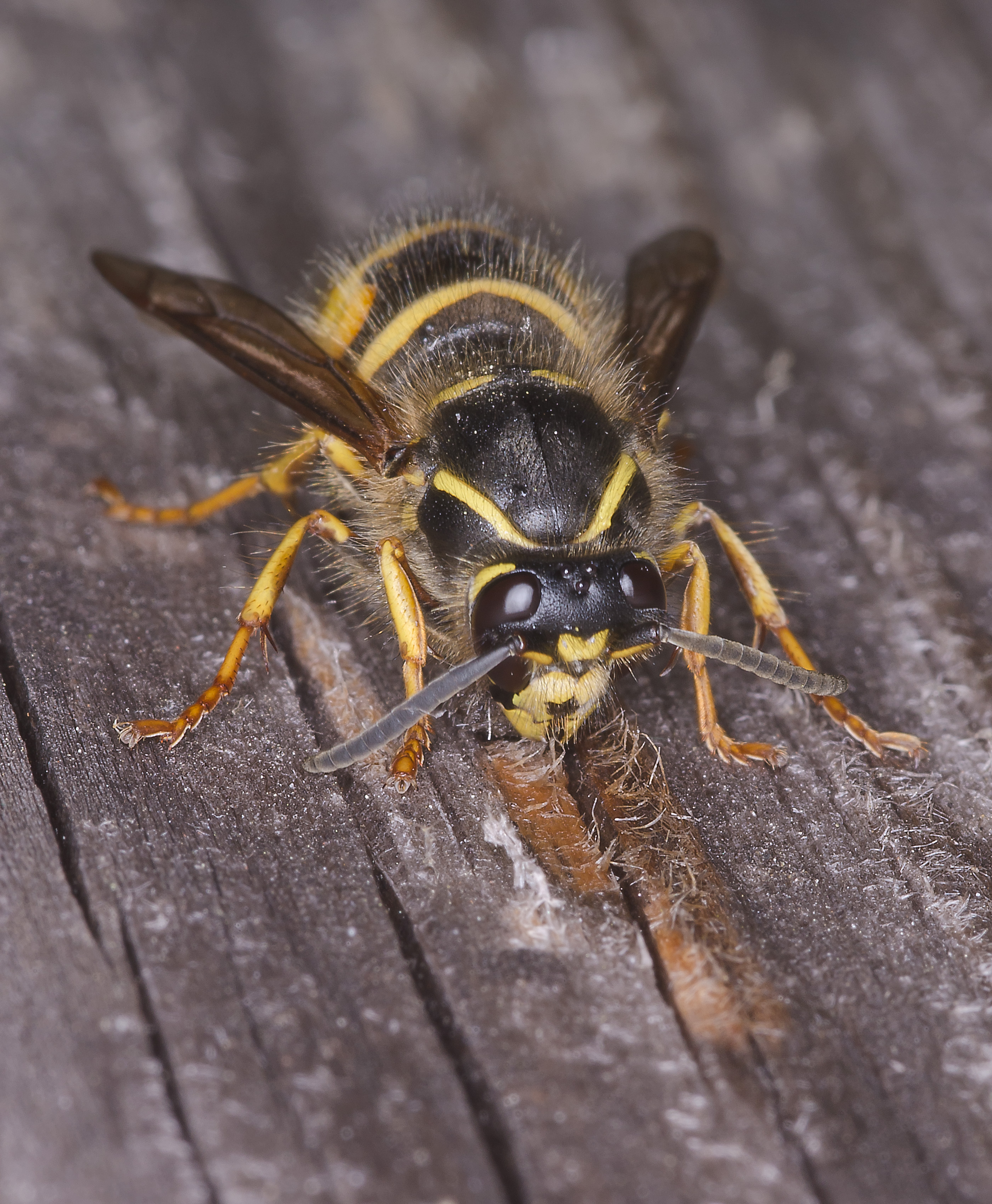

Scientific classification
- Kingdom: Animalia
- Phylum: Arthropoda
- Clade: Pancrustacea
- Class: Insecta
- Order: Hymenoptera
- Family: Vespidae
- Genus: Dolichovespula
- Species: D. saxonica

Binomial name
- Dolichovespula saxonica (Fabricius, 1793)

Synonyms
- Dolichovespula kamtschatkensis Eck, 1983; Dolichovespula nigrescens Eck, 1983; Dolichovespula nipponica Yamane, 1975; Vespa bavarica Schrank, 1802; Vespa tridens Schenck, 1853; Vespula monticola Birula, 1930

= Dolichovespula saxonica =

Species of wasp

Dolichovespula saxonica, also known as the Saxon wasp, is a common social wasp found in the Palearctic region, specifically in large parts of Europe and in northern and central Asia. Although originally from continental Europe, D. saxonica has since colonised Britain, mainly in the south and east, but has been recorded as far north as East Lothian, Scotland. Most of their nests are above ground in trees and bushes, but they can also be found in buildings. Due to the proliferation of nests in urban areas and near residential homes, D. saxonica can be a pest for people. As a result, many human interventions are in place to remove Saxon nests. D. saxonica has been found to use chemical signaling in a lot of behaviours, such as alarm calls, fertility cues, and chemical trails.

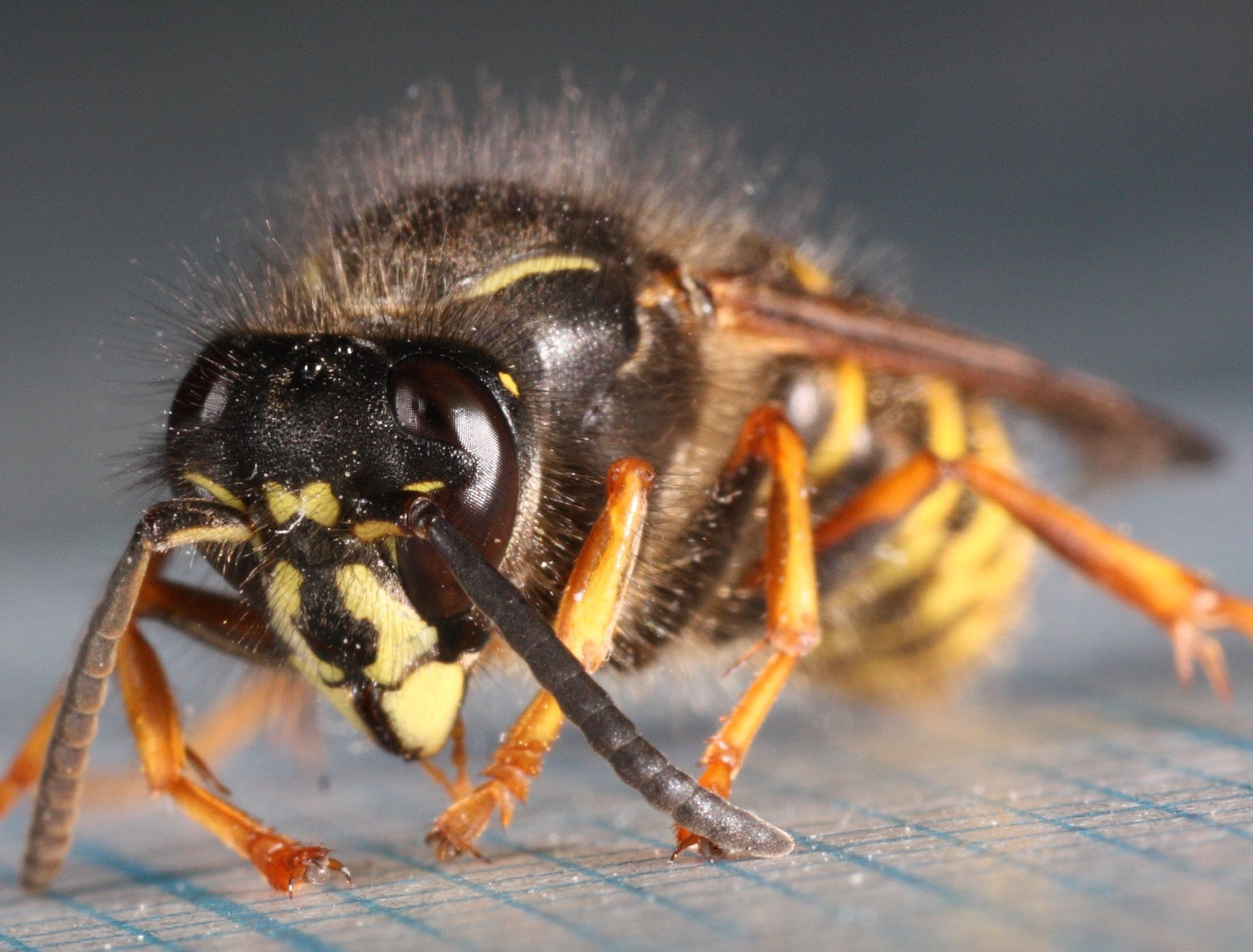
D. saxonica

== Taxonomy and phylogenetics ==
The Saxon wasp is part of the family Vespidae, a large family of varied wasp species. Within the Vespidae is the genus Dolichovespula, which is derived from the Greek word “dolikhos,” meaning “long.” This describes the characteristic long face found within the genus, as opposed to the short and round faces found in the genus Vespula. Dolichovespula contains 18 species, including D. saxonica, and most are found throughout the Northern Hemisphere. Dolichovespula is closely related to Vespula, and species from both genera constitute the yellowjackets. Many of the species within Dolichovespula choose aerial nest sites, though most illustrate flexibility in nest site locations. This differs from the genus Vespula, whose members often make subterranean nests. Dolichovespula species typically have mature colonies of about a thousand cells with about two thousand adults and a colony cycle that lasts three to five months.

== Description and identification ==
D. saxonica is similar to its yellowjacket relatives with the black and yellow stripes on its body. However, the Saxon wasp is larger than most of its relatives. The Saxon queens are largest with a body length ranging from 15–19 mm (.59–.75 in), while the males range from 13–15 mm (.51–.59 in) and the workers from 11–15 mm (.43–.59 in). The male body consists of a copulatory casing at the end of their gaster and seven gastral tergites – hardened plates, or sclerites that are divided on the dorsal side of the body – and sternites, which are sclerites on the ventral side of the thorax. On the other hand, the female has six gastral tergites and sternites and a sting at the end of their gaster.

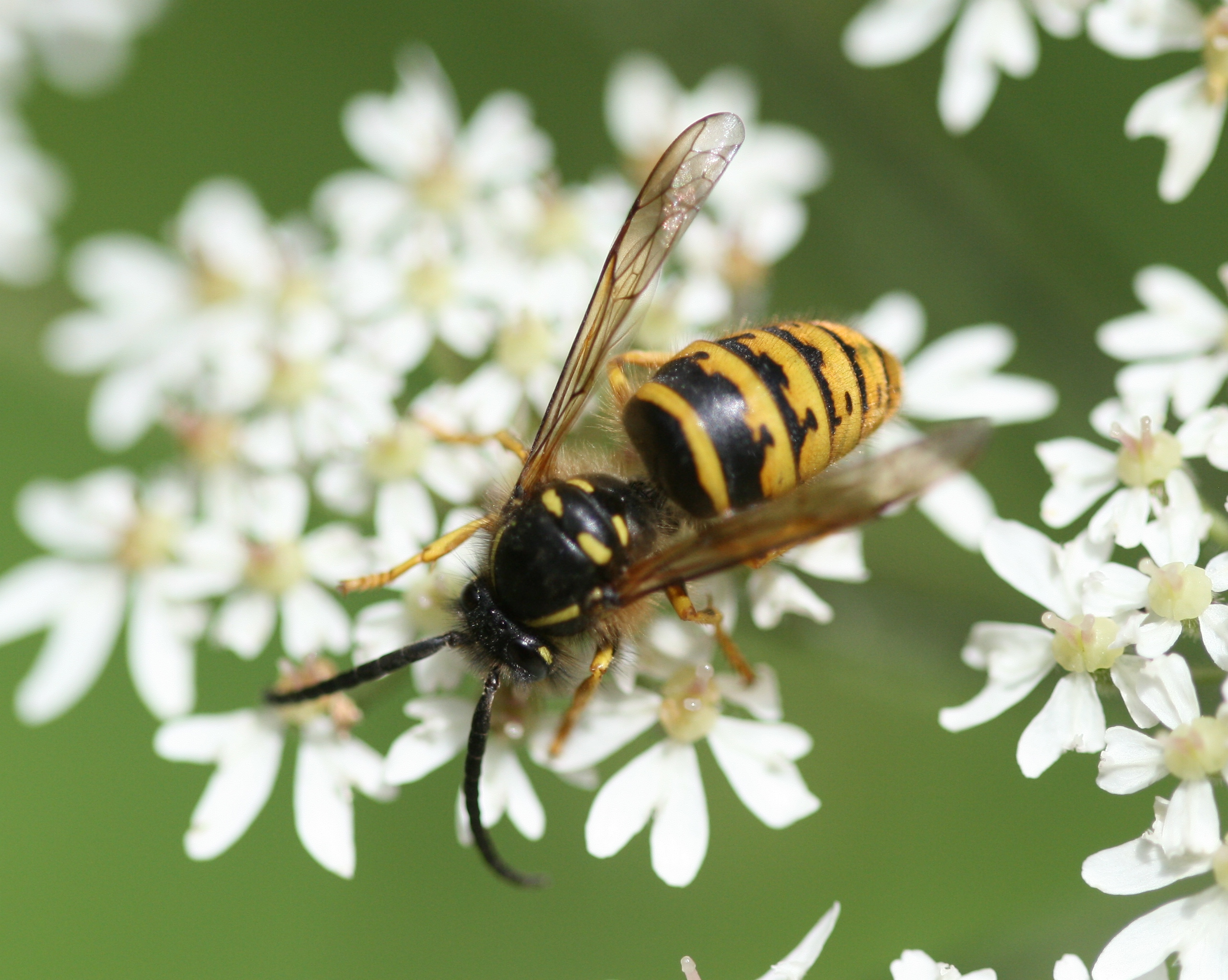
Male in East Lothian

D. saxonica is an aerial nester, meaning that the wasps build their nests above ground, often in trees, shrubs, or buildings. The nests of D. saxonica are ball-shaped and can be roughly 250 mm (9.8 in), which is small relative to other wasp nests. Nest construction is done quickly, allowing the nest population to increase rapidly. On average, nests contain three to five combs, while a large nest can contain up to five. The Saxon wasps build their nests from rotting wood, using the fibres from the wood to form a grey coloured nest that can contain yellow lines or patches on the exterior. The external side of the nest is smooth and does not have any ventilation holes. Instead, there is a single opening at the bottom where wasps can enter and exit and where waste can leave the nest.

== Distribution and habitat ==
The Saxon wasp is commonly found in most of Europe and in northern and central Asia. Areas where the species can be commonly found include the United Kingdom (Southern only), the Czech Republic, northern France, the Netherlands and most recently the east of Ireland in 2020. Within these areas, the nests of D. saxonica can be found hanging freely in various forest types, the open countryside, and wooded hills. Since these wasps are aerial nesters, the nests are often hanging on tree branches or shrubs, a couple meters off the ground. Urban areas are also suitable habitats for D. saxonica. As a result, their nests have been found under roofs, porches, park benches, and on the sides of buildings. Despite this flexibility in nesting sites, rarely are subterranean nests found.

== Colony cycle ==
Similar to other wasp species, colonies of D. saxonica build up during the summer time and decline during the winter. Queens are the only ones capable of surviving the winter due to their form of hibernation called overwintering, which occurs within sheds, hollow trees, or other similar cavities. The queens that do survive the winter find a new colony in the springtime, around April to early May. Their job is to find a good nesting location and rear the first set of workers. By early June, the first set of workers emerges, begins to expand the nest, and builds large-cells for potential gynes. In early July, the new queens emerge and mate, leading to the end of the colony around mid-August. At the peak of the cycle, there may be a few thousand wasps. This entire cycle is roughly 3 to 4 months long, though the exact timing of events is heavily dependent on weather. When the temperature drops and winter arrives, the cycle begins again.

== Behaviour ==
=== Chemical trails for next orientation ===
The nests of D. saxonica are constructed with only one opening to allow for wasps, resources, and waste to enter and exit the nest. This opening has a thick rim and is located at the bottom of the round-shaped nest. When foragers leave the nest in search for food, individuals do not fly in an artificial tunnel system to orient themselves like other wasp species. Rather, D. saxonica foragers utilize chemicals to create a nest odor to orient themselves while flying back to the aerial nest. This odor can come from the materials used in the nest envelope or the other structural components of the nest. D. saxonica foragers can also walk beneath the nest to create a chemical trail to orient themselves within the nest's proximity, though this method is not used often since they do not usually walk while in the vicinity of the nest.

=== Thermal regulation ===
Ideally, D. saxonica nests are stable at approximately 84 °F (29 °C). However, the months of May through August in Europe and Asia deviate from this comfortable temperature. One way D. saxonica colonies have adapted to this is by shortening or shifting colony cycles during ideal temperatures. A more realistic way to avoid overheating or freezing is to regulate nest temperature. D. saxonica wasps possess thermosensitive receptors on their cuticles, which sense the surrounding temperature. In the rare cases of nests that are naturally sheltered, such as with subterranean nests or nests in hollow trees, a few additional envelopes around the nest can help keep temperatures stable. In the majority of cases, where aerial nests are involved, there must be many more envelopes surrounding the nest, since they are exposed to natural elements such as strong winds and rain. This can become hazardous to the nest because additional envelopes take up a majority of the volume of the nest and in order to expand the nest, the inner envelopes must first be broken down and new envelopes built on the exterior surface. Due to the potential dangers of temperature regulation, it becomes advantageous for colonies to locate their nests in urban areas, where the climate is warmer and they are sheltered from the weather.

=== Communication ===
==== Alarm pheromone ====
There are multiple forms of communication displayed in D. saxonica colonies. One of these forms of is an alarm pheromone produced in the wasps' venom glands. For D. saxonica, the alarm behaviour is believed to ensue in response to sprayed venom or when a wasp stings. This type of alarm is seen in other vespines and acts to bring workers together to increase aggressive and fighting behaviours. This is advantageous to the colony because it allows workers to prevent harm to the nest by attacking a predator collectively. Alarm calls typically only last for a short amount of time, allowing the colony to return to their normal duties in a timely manner.

==== Fertility cues ====
Another form of communication found in D. saxonica regards fertility. As with other social insects, there is a reproductive division of labour in colonies where the queens reproduce and the workers build cells and raise the queen's offspring. However, workers possess their own ovaries and thus are able to produce unfertilised male eggs, creating a conflict. To ensure that the queen continues to hold “reproductive dominance,” she signals her fertility to the rest of the colony, and the workers act to increase their genetic success by allowing the queen to reproduce in the beginning of the colony cycle. The queen's signal is a chemical cue from pheromones that is believed to decrease as the colony matures, thus allowing more workers to reproduce. In addition, the fertility of all D. saxonica individuals – workers, males, and queens – can be determined by their cuticular hydrocarbon cues. Specific cues increase with queen ovary development and decrease with colony maturity and worker reproduction, which supports the timeline of pheromone signal strength from queens.

== Kin selection ==
=== Worker-queen conflict ===
Species within the genus Dolichovespula have queens who can mate only once or mate multiply. This small difference can lead to differences in kinship, which is vital in social insects such as D. saxonica. This difference in kinship arises because workers are capable of producing unfertilised, male eggs. Due to this ability, if a queen mates only once, workers are more closely related to the male offspring of other workers than of the queen. Therefore, when a queen only mates once, workers should choose to help rear the offspring of other workers to increase their genetic success. If a queen mates more than once, it is in the worker's best interest to rear the queen's sons. To remedy this worker queen conflict, D. saxonica demonstrates facultative worker policing, where workers inhibit other workers from reproducing – through acts like eating workers’ eggs – so that the queen remains reproductively dominant. This, however, is only in the workers’ best interest if the queen mate multiplied. Worker policing and worker reproduction are also correlated with colony development. Early in the colony cycle, worker policing is high, resulting in low worker reproduction. Once the colony matures, worker policing declines and successful worker reproduction increases. This trend is due to the fact that worker reproduction early on in the colony cycle would deter work force growth and would ultimately hinder worker fitness.

== Interaction with other species ==
=== Parasites within the genus ===
Dolichovespula adulterina is a common social parasite. It is a parasite of Dolichovespula arenaria and Dolichovespula alpicola in the Nearctic region, which covers North America, Greenland, and the highlands of Mexico. D. adulterina is also a parasite of D. saxonica and Dolichovespula norwegica of the Palearctic region, which includes Europe, northern and central Asia, and northern Africa. In the case of D. saxonica, the D. adulterina queen usually usurps the nest around the time that the host's first set of workers emerge in early June. Since only one set of the host's offspring has emerged, if the D. adulterina queen takes over the host nest at the beginning of the colony cycle, there will be fewer total combs as well as fewer individuals from the host species. The later in the colony cycle, the more likely it will be that the host species’ workers and males will be present. After usurping, the D. adulterina queen will cohabit the nest with the D. saxonica queen for about 10 days, which is when the D. adulterina queen kills the host queen. Then, the D. adulterina queen lays her eggs around the beginning of July, which the host's workers look after. The males will then emerge at the end of July, while the gynes will emerge at the beginning of August until the colony declines in the middle of the month. Thus, the colony cycle for the parasitic yellowjacket is about a month shorter than the host's and with fewer offspring. There might also be fewer offspring because the parasitic queen will often die shortly after laying her eggs in July or earlier if she is injured during conflicts with the host's workers.

=== Parasites outside the genus ===
The ichneumonid wasp Sphecophaga vesparum is an important and common parasitoid of a few vespid wasps. In the past, S. vesparum wasps have been used to combat the invasive species' populations of Vespula germanica and Vespula vulgaris in places like New Zealand. This species has also been observed to be a parasite of D. saxonica. The degree of destruction to D. saxonica nests has been seen as moderate, relative to other parasitic species and is dependent on timing. Similar to D. adulterina invasions, the earlier the host's nest is infected, the more effective the infection. Rather than usurping the nest, however, S. vesparum females enter the host's nest and lay their eggs on top of the host's larvae or pupae. This allows the parasitic larvae to attack and feed on the host's larvae, and then spin a cocoon. Despite the fact that S. vesparum is a common parasite of D. saxonica, S. vesparum does not rapidly grow in a host's nest; only a few dozen S. vesparum individuals are typically found within a nest of hundreds of cells.

=== Disease ===
The one opening in D. saxonica nests is found at the bottom of the spherically-shaped nest. This single opening serves as the entrance, exit, and waste removal site for the Saxon wasps. As a result, when waste and debris leave the nest, they simply fall out of the opening and onto the floor, where it collects. This waste collection site provides many resources, and unsurprisingly, many pathogens are found here, such as Pseudomonas aeruginosa, Staphylococcus aureus, Escherichia coli, and Klebsiella oxytoca. Fungi are also found, including Aspergillus niger and Candida krusei. Although these pathogens and fungi utilize the wasp's detritus, it becomes a problem for people as they can lead to infection, respiratory disease, and allergies. The Saxon wasp nests are found to have less bacteria and fungi when located in natural places as opposed to urban ones. This is thought to be due to workers actively cleaning the combs and cells of such microorganisms by using their venom.

== Human importance ==
=== Benefits ===
The Saxon wasp plays a vital role in the ecosystem. Adult Saxon wasps can feed on a variety of things, including the nectar of many plants. Therefore, the species can benefit agriculture when they collect the nectar by unknowingly pollinating many plants. For example, queens pollinate bilberry flowers in the spring, while workers and males pollinate wild angelica, wild parsnip, and hogweed blossom flowers towards the end of summer. Saxon wasps can also decrease populations of insects, such as flies, since the larvae are fed on them. Perhaps more importantly, insects like the Saxon wasp can transport and recycle organic and inorganic matter, such as cadmium, iron, lead, and zinc. This is especially important due to the increasing amounts of environmental pollution due to chemical and industrial industries.

=== Stings and other dangers ===
D. saxonica may cause a disturbance to people due to the close proximity of their nests. However, they do not become violent or harmful unless their nest is disrupted or threatened. If an individual senses danger, it can emit an alarm pheromone to its colony, which attracts others and stimulates aggressiveness and flight behaviour. This not only causes an individual to sting any intruders, but it also causes others to do the same. Fortunately, the stings are not especially painful compared to e.g. those of the German Wasp or Common Wasp, and its venom does not activate an allergic reaction very often.

Another danger to humans caused by the Saxon wasp is the potential for disease. As stated above, the collected waste below a nest may cause foul stains on ceilings and walls. Some examples of the potential pathogens include Escherichia coli, which is the pathogen most noted in improperly prepared food; Klebsiella oxytoca, which can cause urinary tract infections; Aspergillus niger, which creates aflatoxins that can lead to respiratory disease and candidiasis; and Candida krusei, which can cause allergies. As a result, although the Saxon wasps themselves may not be dangerous, the pathogens they attract can be. Luckily, nests can be easily spotted because they are usually built in easily visible locations.

=== Colonies in cities ===
Although Saxon nests are almost exclusively found above ground, they are not exclusively found in one type of environment. Saxon colonies are found in nature, such as in forests and wooded hills, but also in urban areas. In fact, urban areas may provide a better environment for colonies to succeed in than natural ones. It has been observed that when colonies are found in urban areas, the colonies are larger in size. This is especially surprising since many colonies are destroyed through human intervention. One of the benefits of nest building in urban environments is the abundance of varied nesting sites, such as under rafters and roofs, in attics, and on the sides of buildings. Not only are these sites more physically stable than a tree branch, but they also provide better climate conditions. Many urban nesting sites are sheltered, resulting in warmer conditions that lack vulnerability to rain and wind. Since Saxon nests typically hang off of a branch, they are exposed to wind, which can knock nests off their branch and damage the nest. In addition, since nests are made out of weathered wood, heavy rain can damage the structure and high humidity can lead to the growth of microorganisms, which can also destroy the structure of the nest and the larvae and pupae inside of it. As a result, urban colonies are better protected from natural elements. Urban colonies also have the advantage of larger food resources.
