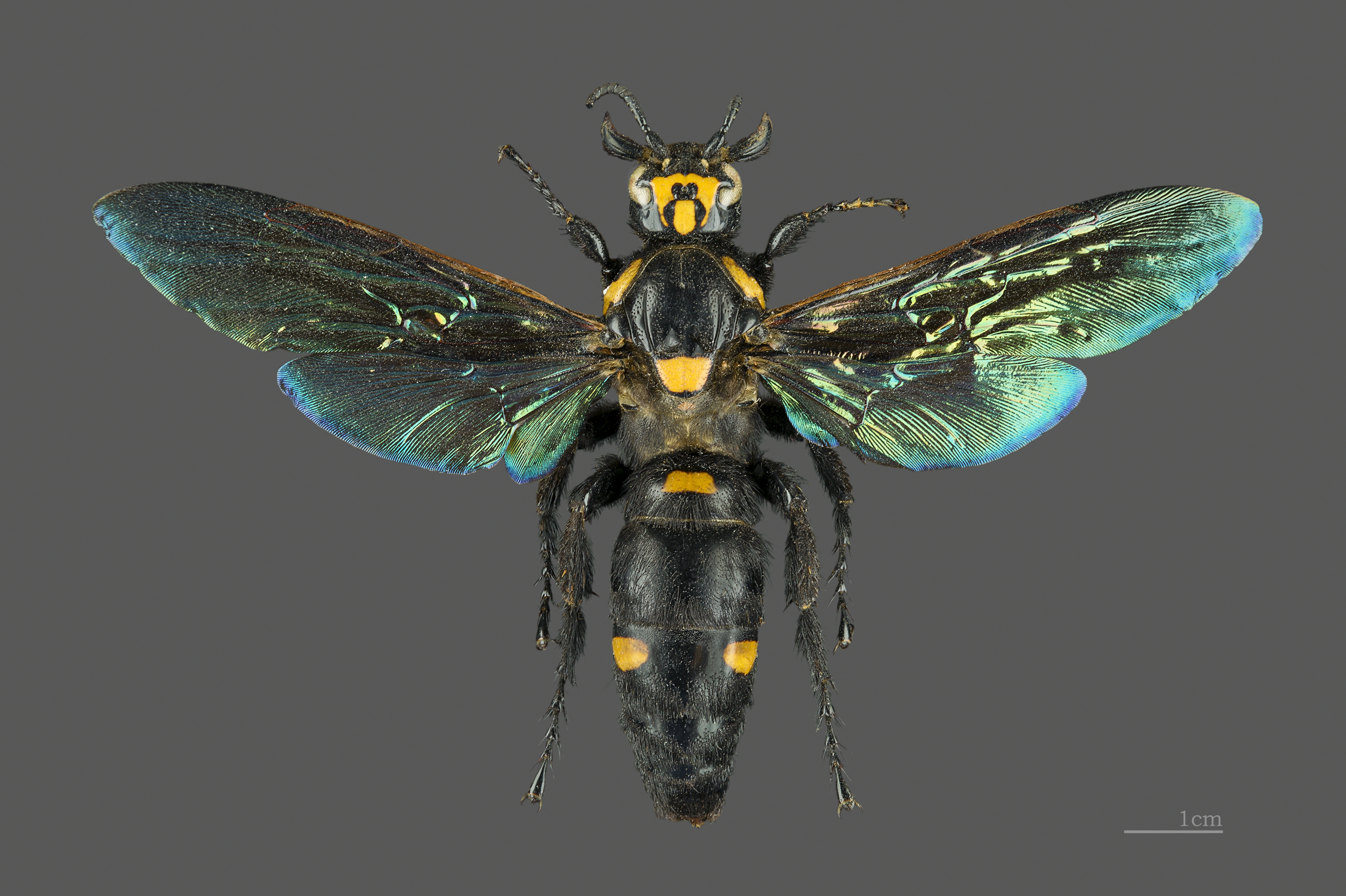
- Megascolia procer female

Scientific classification
- Kingdom: Animalia
- Phylum: Arthropoda
- Clade: Pancrustacea
- Class: Insecta
- Order: Hymenoptera
- Family: Scoliidae
- Tribe: Scoliini
- Genus: Megascolia; Betrem, 1928

Type species
- Scolia procer Illiger, 1802

Species
- 3 species, see text

= Megascolia =

Genus of wasps

Megascolia is a genus of large solitary wasps from the family Scoliidae, the species classified under Megascolia include some of the world's largest wasps.

== Biology ==
They are parasitoids of large Scarabeid beetles such as the European rhinoceros beetle Oryctes nasicornis and Atlas beetle Chalcosoma atlas.

== Taxonomy and phylogeny ==
Megascolia was originally described in 1927 by Betrem as a subgenus of Triscolia. Betrem and Bradley elevated both subgenera to genus status in 1964, retaining Megascolia for Old World species and Triscolia for New World species. They also divided Megascolia into two subgenera: Megascolia (Megascolia) and Megascolia (Regiscolia). In 2025, Castagnet and Cabon split Regiscolia into a separate genus, while describing a third genus, Gigascolia, for remaining species.

== Species ==
The following 3 species are classified in the genus Megascolia'':

- Megascolia procer (Illiger, 1802)
- Megascolia scutellaris (Gribodo, 1893)
- Megascolia velutina (Saussure, 1859)
