= Gigascolia =

Scientific classification
- Kingdom: Animalia
- Phylum: Arthropoda
- Clade: Pancrustacea
- Class: Insecta
- Order: Hymenoptera
- Family: Scoliidae
- Subfamily: Scoliinae
- Tribe: Scoliini
- Genus: Gigascolia; Castagnet & Cabon, 2025

Type species
- Scolia speciosa Smith, 1858

Species
- 2 species, see text

Genus of wasps

Gigascolia is a genus of solitary wasps from the family Scoliidae.

== Taxonomy and phylogeny ==
Gigascolia was described in 2025 by Castagnet and Cabon as part of a revision of species formerly treated under Megascolia.

== Species ==
There are 2 species of Gigascolia:

- Gigascolia speciosa (Smith, 1857)
- Gigascolia speciosissima Castagnet & Cabon, 2025
