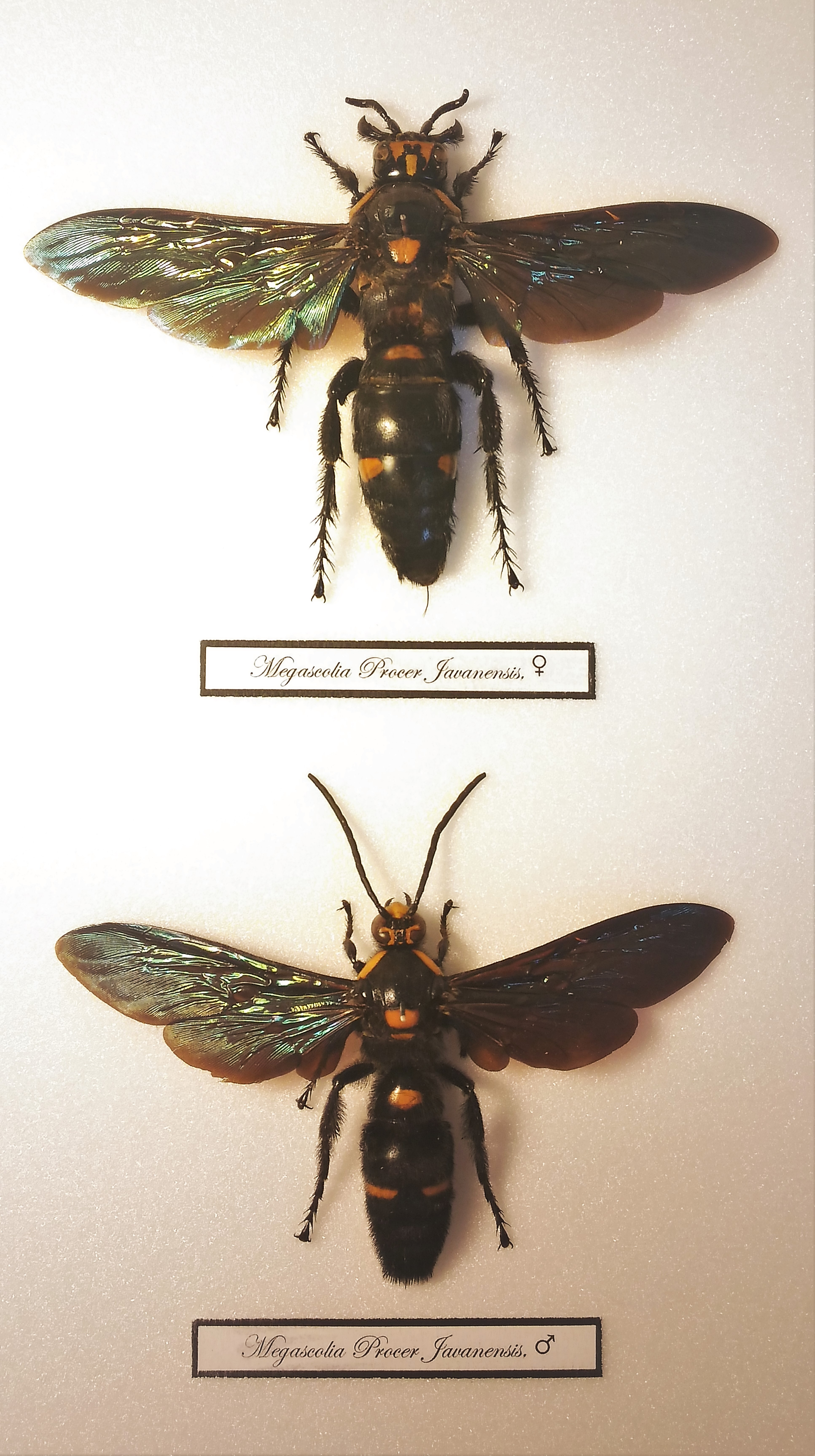
- Female (top) and male (bottom) of Megascolia procer javanensis. Private collection, F. Turetta.

Scientific classification
- Kingdom: Animalia
- Phylum: Arthropoda
- Clade: Pancrustacea
- Class: Insecta
- Order: Hymenoptera
- Family: Scoliidae
- Genus: Megascolia
- Species: M. procer

Binomial name
- Megascolia procer (Illiger, 1802)

Synonyms
- Triscolia procer (Illiger, 1802); Scolia procer Illiger, 1802

= Megascolia procer =

Species of wasp

Megascolia procer is a solitary wasp in the family Scoliidae found across Asia. It is one of the largest wasps in the world, with a wingspan of 11.6 cm (4.6 in).

== Description ==
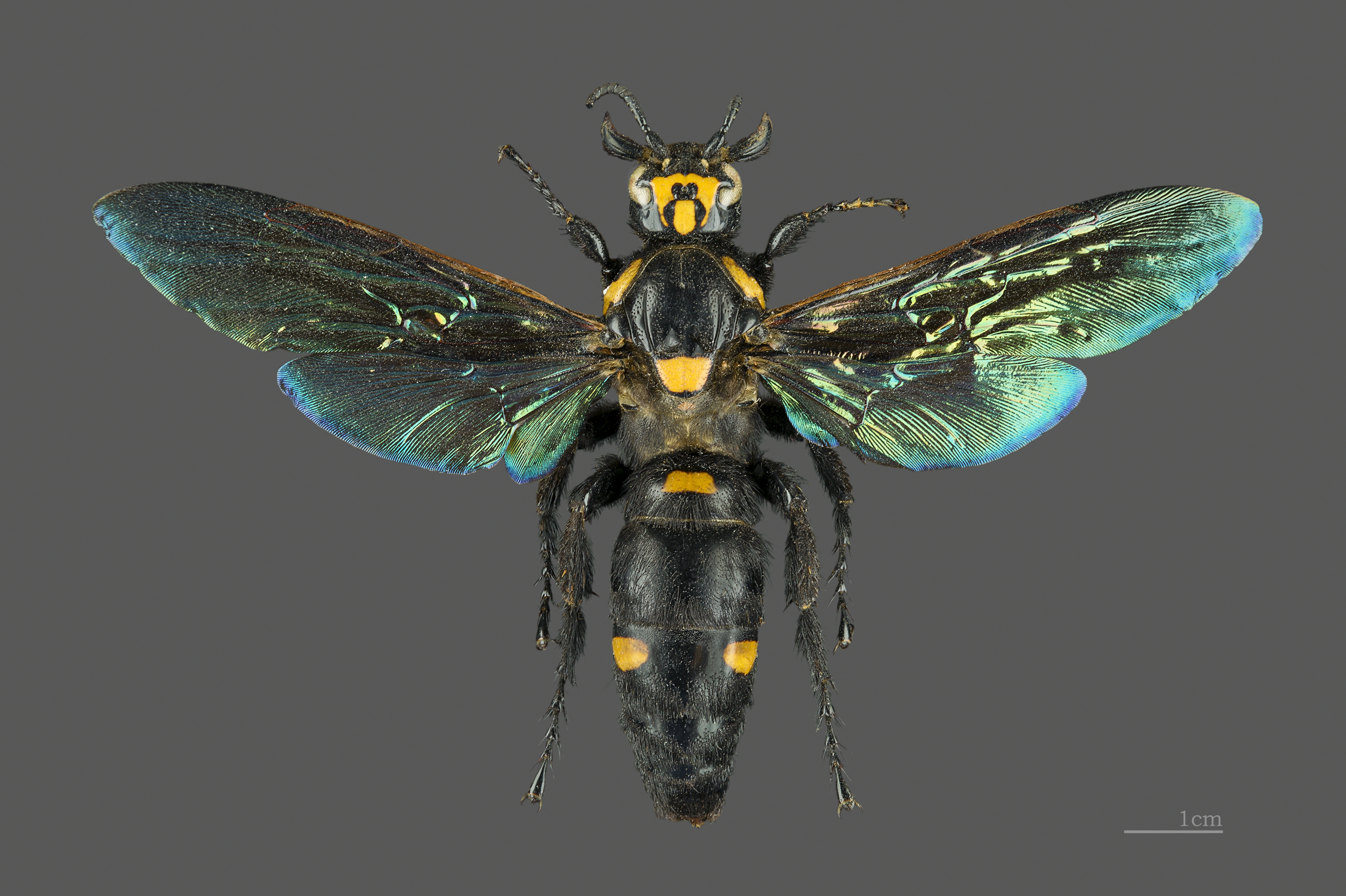
Female specimen

M. procer is a large tropical wasp with a body length of 46–77 mm (1.8–3.0 in). The body is primarily black with yellowish markings on the front and vertex of the head, pronotum, scutellum, metanotum, medial spot on the first gastral tergite, and a pair of anterolateral spots on the third gastal tergite.

== Wing coloration ==
The wings of Megascolia procer are dark and opaque, but display a striking blue-green iridescence that shifts with viewing angle. Despite the apparent complexity of the effect, the mechanism is among the simplest known in biological structural coloration. Detailed study of the Javan subspecies M. p. javanensis by Sarrazin, Vigneron, Welch and Rassart, using reflection spectroscopy and scanning electron microscopy, established that the iridescence arises from a single homogeneous transparent layer of chitin covering the entire surface of each wing — one of the most elementary thin-film interference filters found in nature. The opacity of the wings — unusually dark compared with most wasps — is produced by a high concentration of melanin in the underlying chitin structure, which provides a dark background that makes the thin-film structural colour appear particularly vivid and saturated. The authors noted that a structurally similar single-layer interference mechanism had independently evolved in the iridescent feathers of the domestic pigeon, illustrating a case of convergent evolution in structural optics.

== Distribution ==
The nominate subspecies has a broad range across the continent of Asia, including records in Indonesia, Malaysia, Singapore, Malaya, Thailand, Myanmar, and India. There are also subspecies found in Sumatra, Java, and Borneo.

== Life cycle ==
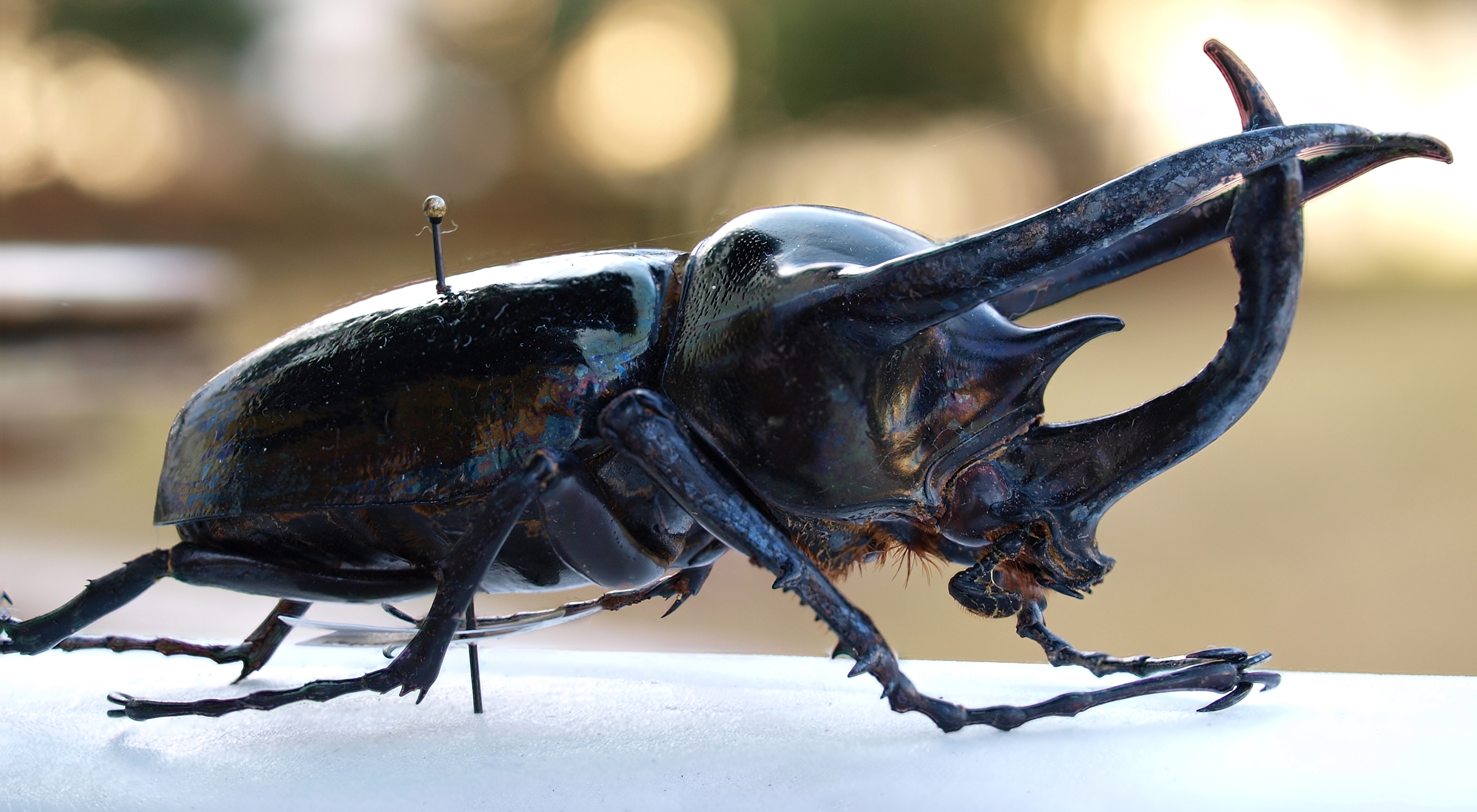
The Atlas beetle, Chalcosoma atlas (male shown), is the host for M. procer.

The species is a parasitoid of the scarabaeid Atlas beetle, Chalcosoma atlas. The wasp paralyzes a beetle grub with its sting, then lays an egg on it and buries it in an underground cell. When the wasp larva hatches, it consumes its still-living host before pupating inside its remains.

== Subspecies ==
There are four subspecies of M. procer:

- Megascolia procer procer (Illiger, 1802) - broadly across Asia
- Megascolia procer bimaculata (Gribodo, 1893) - Palawan
- Megascolia procer javanensis Betrem, 1964 - Java
- Megascolia procer nigriventris (Mantero, 1903) - Borneo

== Gallery ==
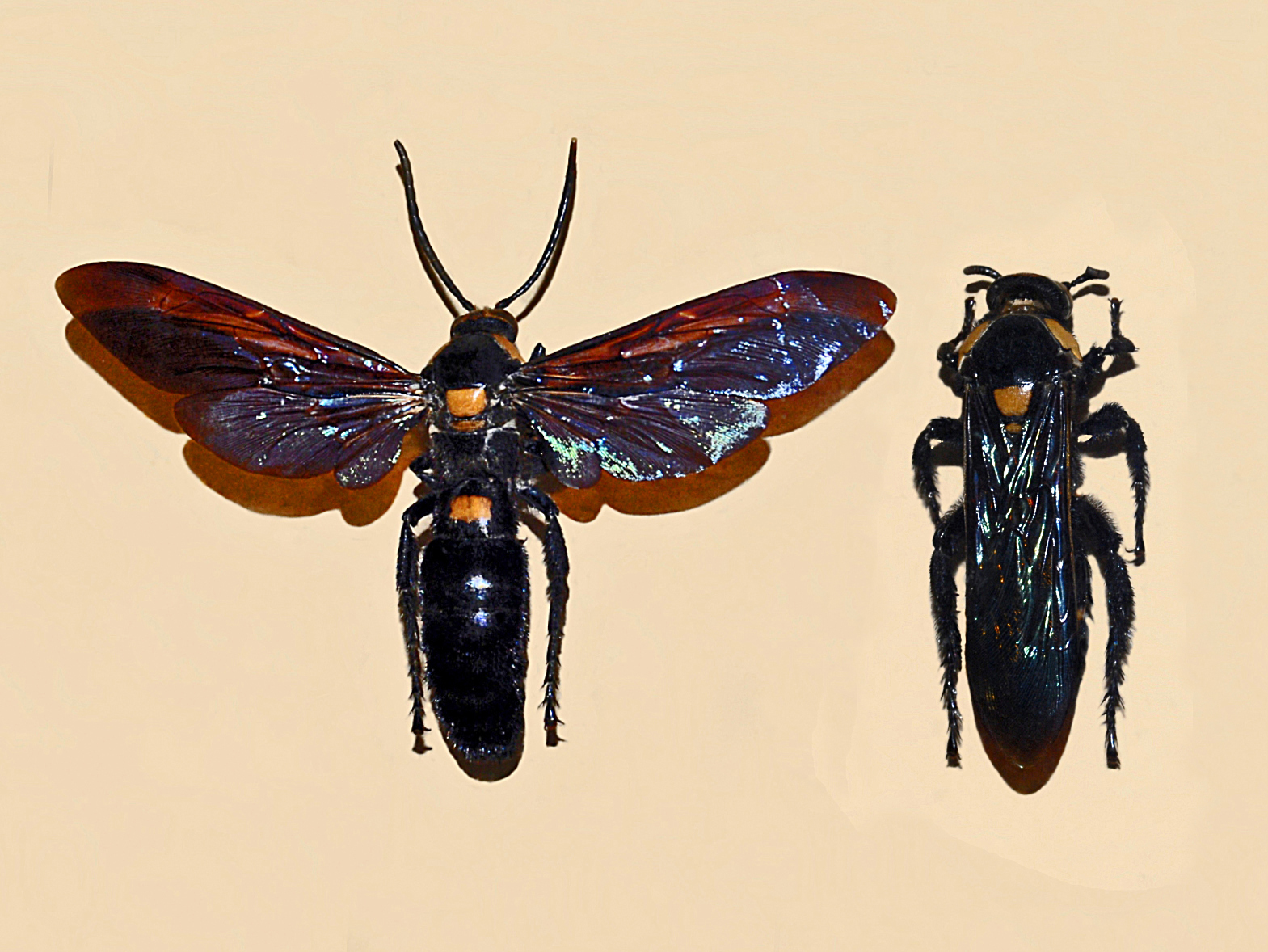
M. p. procer from Sumatra

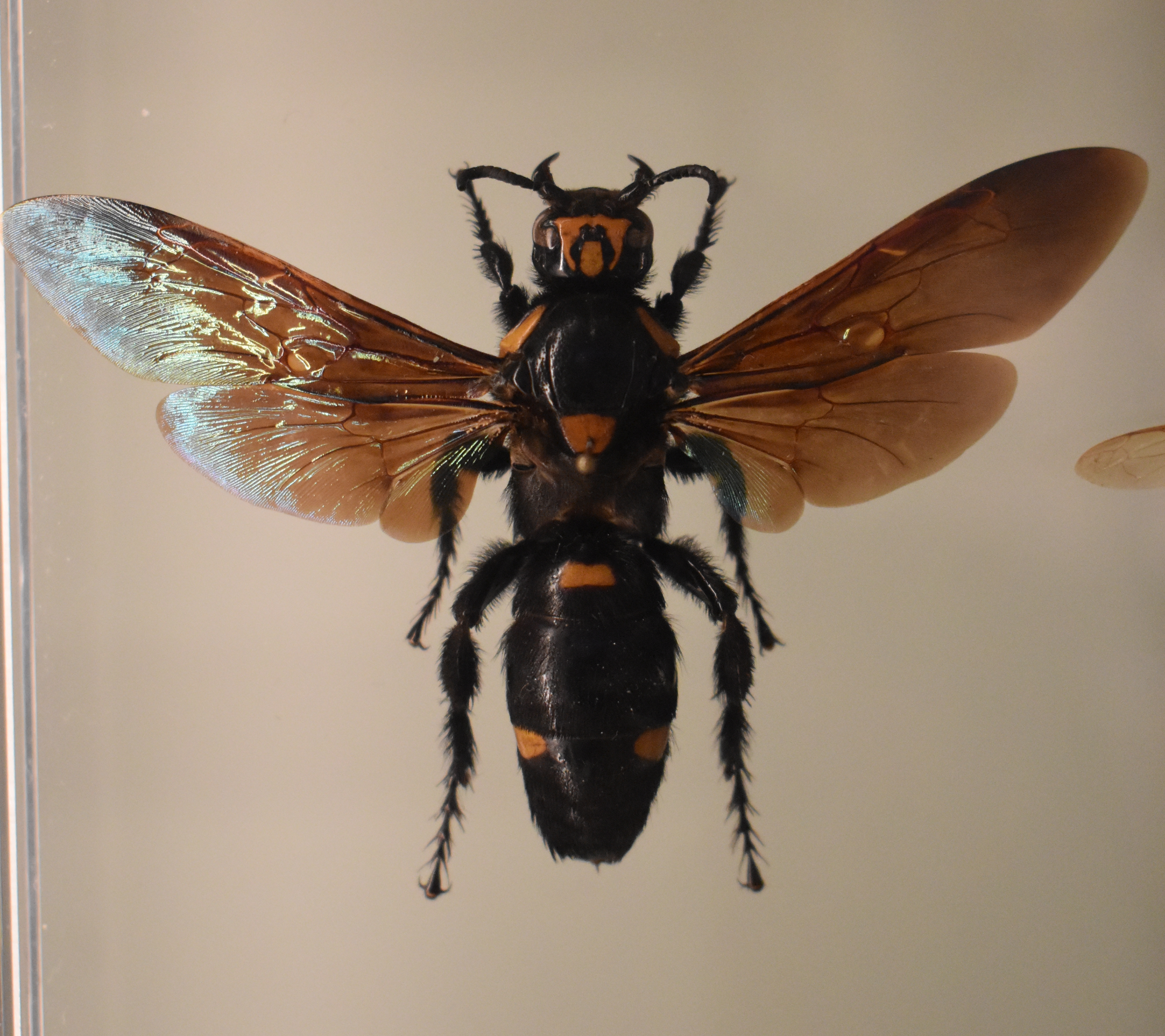
M. p. javanensis from Java

== See also ==
- List of largest insects
