= Progressive provisioning =

Progressive provisioning is a term used in entomology to refer to a form of parental behavior in which an adult (most commonly a hymenopteran such as a bee or wasp) feeds its larvae directly after they have hatched, feeding each larva repeatedly until it has completed development. The food is typically in the form of masticated or immobilized prey items (in predatory wasps), or regurgitated nectar mixed with pollen (in bees); only rarely are other sorts of food resources used (such as glandular secretions, or carrion). While this sort of direct and repetitive feeding of offspring is extremely common in groups such as birds and mammals, it is far less common among insects, with the exception of eusocial insects (one of the defining features of eusociality is cooperative brood care). Accordingly, progressive provisioning is universal among ants, and widespread among the social bees and wasps. Certain nonsocial wasps also rear their young with this type of feeding. Young termites (and other hemimetabolous insects) are able to feed themselves, and therefore do not demonstrate any form of provisioning.

One of the only well-known examples of progressive provisioning outside of the Hymenoptera are the burying beetles, which care for their larvae and supply them with a mass of carrion, which the adults chew and regurgitate to the developing larvae.

Many eusocial bees, such as stingless bees and halictids, practice mass provisioning, where all of the larval food is supplied before the egg is laid.

== See also ==
- Mass provisioning
