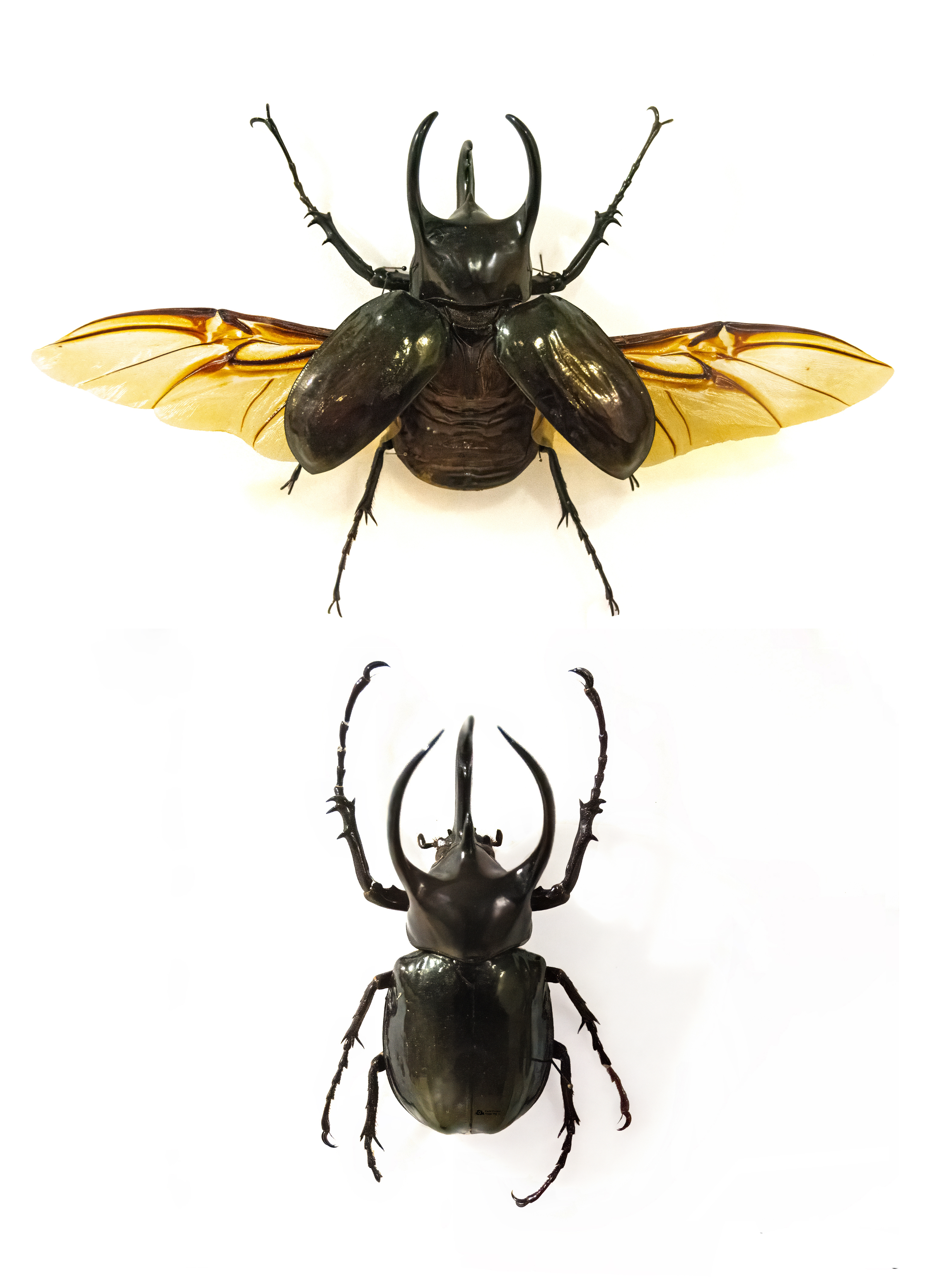

Scientific classification
- Kingdom: Animalia
- Phylum: Arthropoda
- Class: Insecta
- Order: Coleoptera
- Suborder: Polyphaga
- Infraorder: Scarabaeiformia
- Family: Scarabaeidae
- Genus: Chalcosoma
- Species: C. atlas

Binomial name
- Chalcosoma atlas (Linnaeus, 1758)

= Atlas beetle =

Species of beetle

The Atlas beetle (Chalcosoma atlas) is a very large species of beetle in the family Scarabaeidae, found in Southeast Asia. Males have three prominent horns. The species is named for Atlas, the giant of Greek mythology who supported the skies.

== Description ==
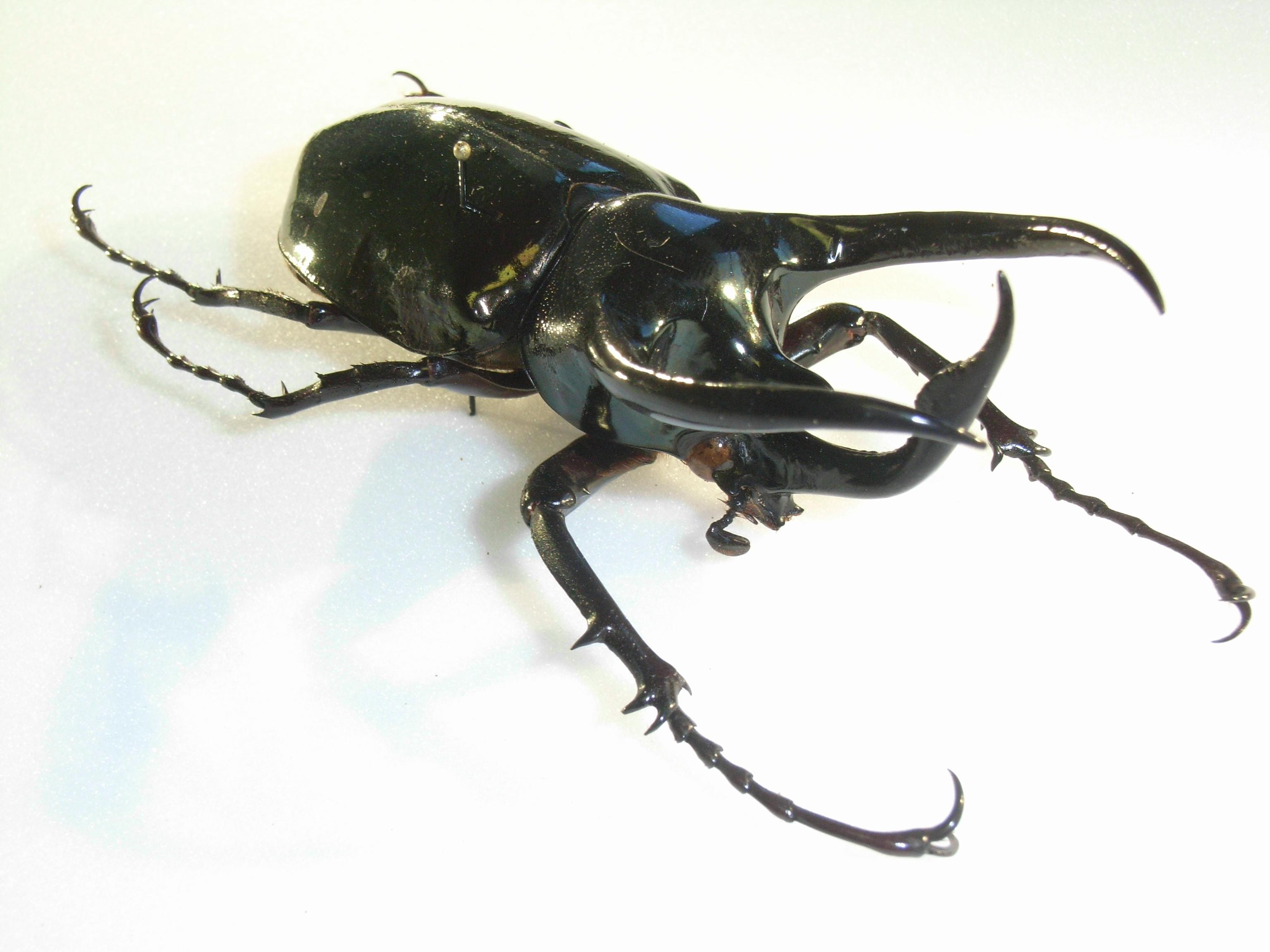
Atlas beetle

Chalcosoma atlas, like other beetles of the genus Chalcosoma, is remarkable for its size. As is common in the Scarabaeidae, males are larger than the females, reaching a length of about 60–120 millimetres (2.4–4.7 in); females are about 25–60 millimetres (0.98–2.36 in). Males have specialised horns on their head and thorax that they use to fight with each other, to gain mating rights with females. The Atlas beetle differs from other Chalcosoma species (such as C. caucasus) by the broader end of the cephalic (head) horn.

== Larvae ==
The larva of the Atlas beetle is known for its fierce behavior, including biting if touched. Unverified reports exist of larvae that live together fighting to the death if they have insufficient space or food.

== Distribution ==
Chalcosoma atlas is found in Southeast Asia.

== Parasitoids ==
The species is the host of a parasitoid, the giant scoliid wasp Megascolia procer, which has a paralysing venom.

== Subspecies ==
- Chalcosoma atlas atlas (Linnaeus, 1758)- Sulawesi
- Chalcosoma atlas butonensis Nagai, 2004- Buton island
- Chalcosoma atlas keyboh Nagai, 2004- Malaysia and Sumatra
- Chalcosoma atlas mantetsu Nagai, 2004- Thailand and Vietnam
- Chalcosoma atlas simeuluensis Nagai, 2004- Simeulue island
- Chalcosoma atlas sintae Nagai, 2004- Peleng islands
- Chalcosoma atlas hesperus (Erichson, 1834)- Philippines

== Gallery ==
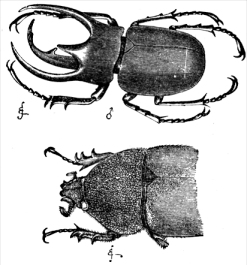
Sexual dimorphism in Chalcosoma atlas. From Darwin's The Descent of Man, 2nd edn. 1882.

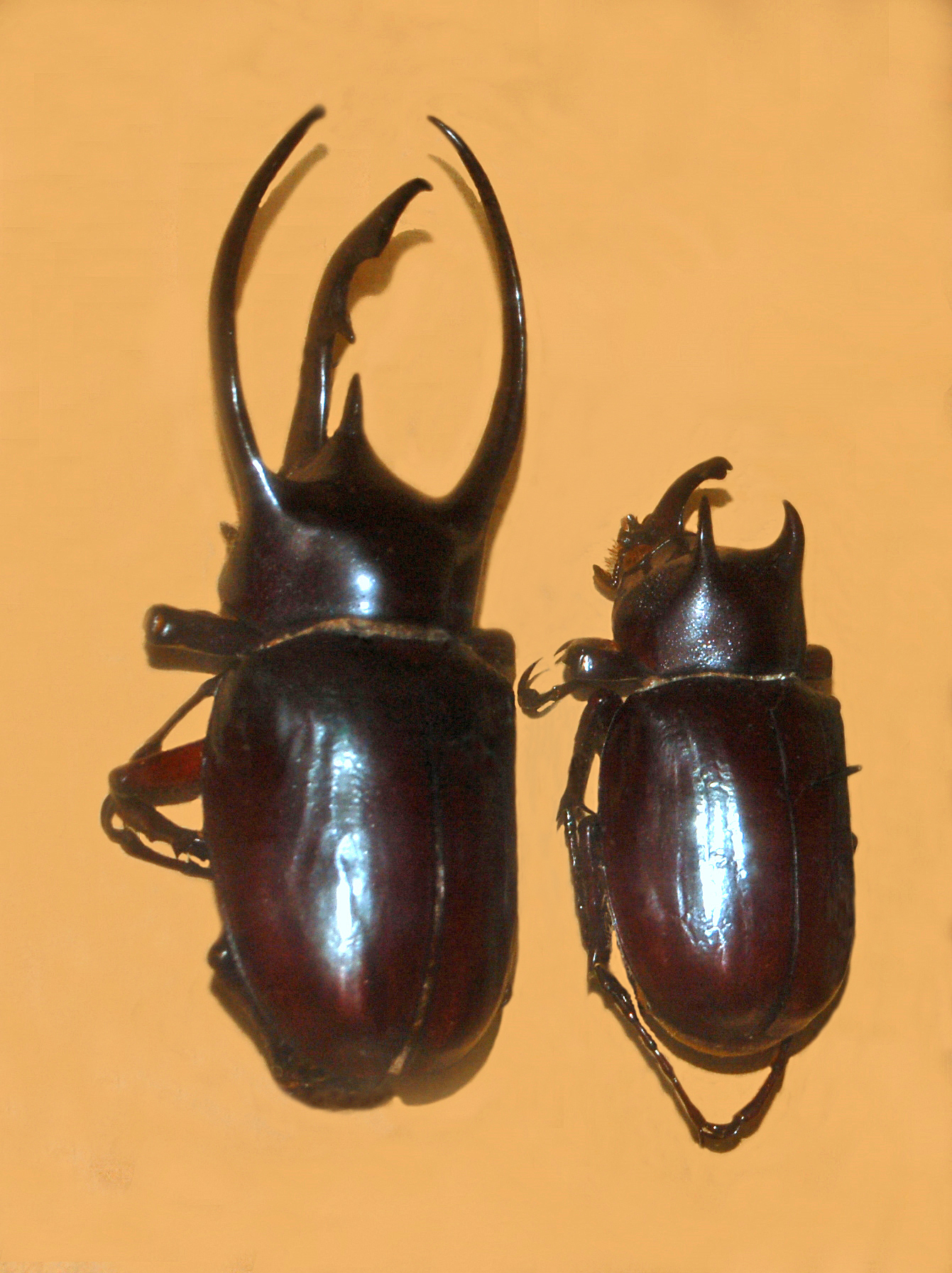
Males of Chalcosoma atlas

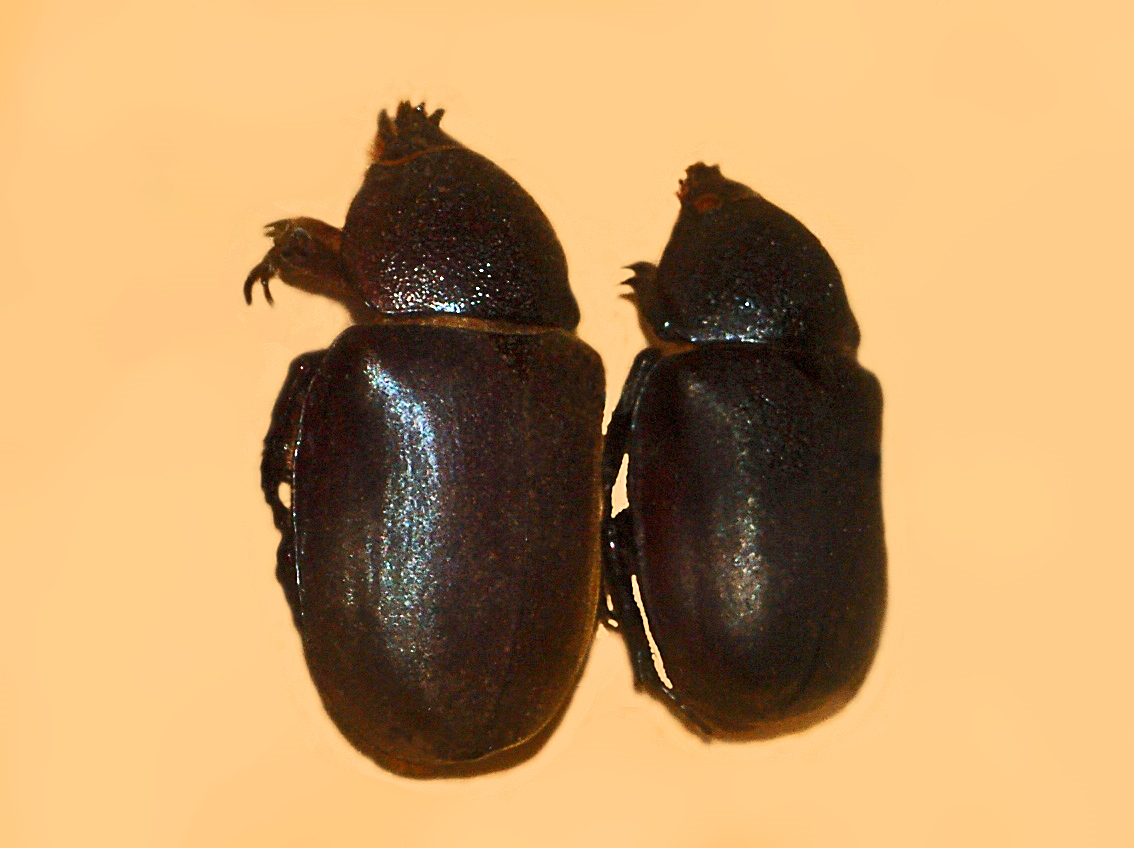
Females of Chalcosoma atlas

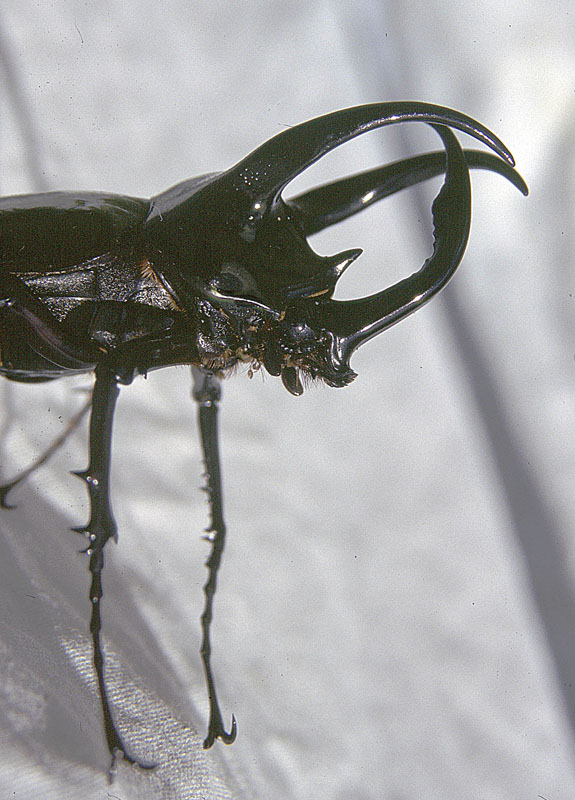
Male, showing broadened cephalic horn
