= Biological interaction =

Effect that organisms have on other organisms

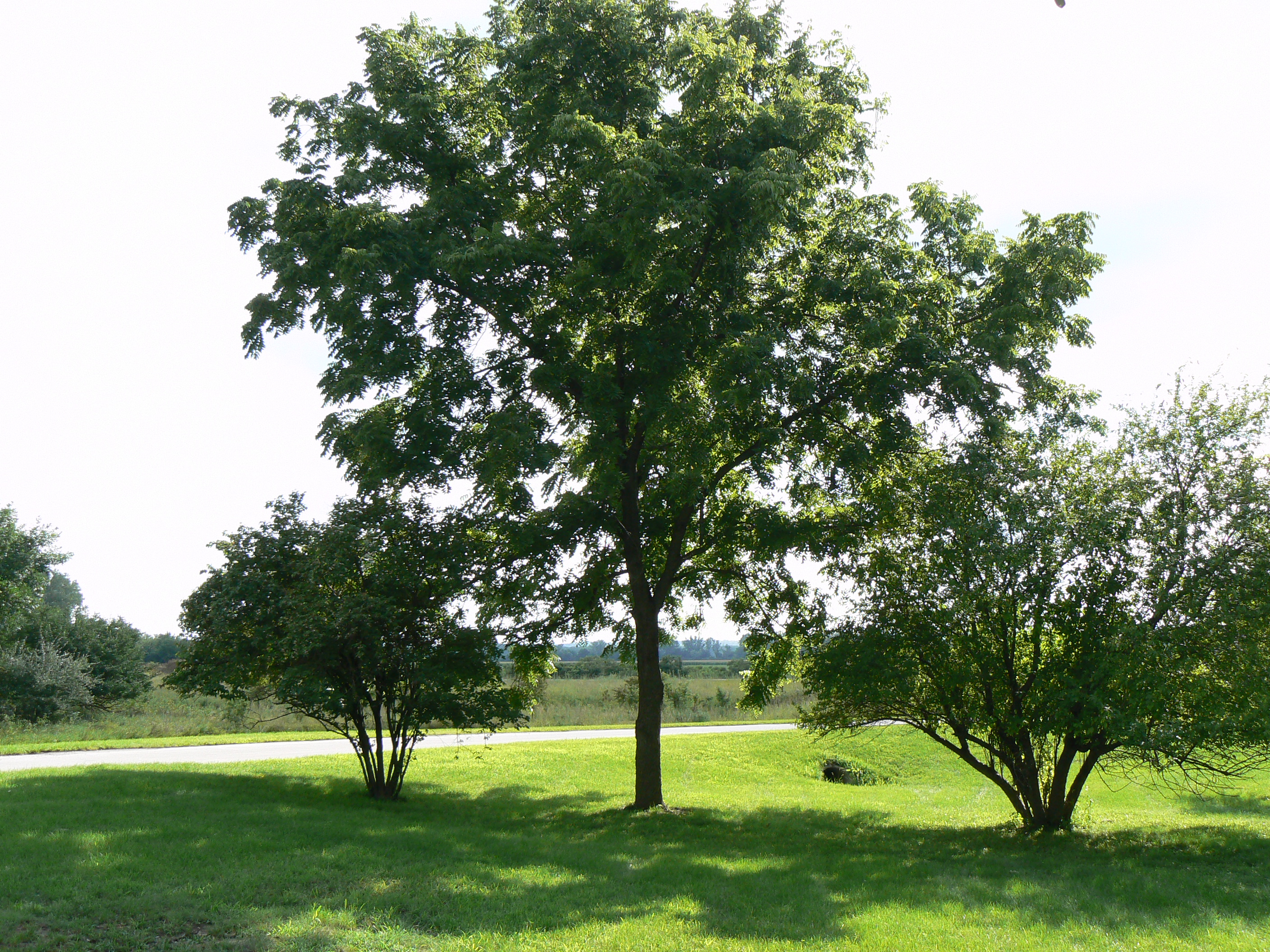
The black walnut secretes a chemical from its root that harms neighboring plants, an example of competitive antagonism.

In ecology, a Species Interaction is the effect that a pair of organisms living together in a community have on each other. They can be either of the same species (intraspecific interactions), or of different species (interspecific interactions). These effects may be short-term or long-term; both often strongly influence the adaptation and evolution of the species involved. Biological interactions range from mutualism, beneficial to both partners, to competition, injurious to both partners. Interactions can be direct when bodily contact is established or indirect through intermediaries such as shared resources, territories, ecological services, metabolic waste, toxins, or growth inhibitors. This type of relationship can be shown by net effect based on individual effects on both organisms arising out of relationship.

Several recent studies have suggested non-trophic species interactions such as habitat modification and mutualisms can be important determinants of food web structures. However, it remains unclear whether these findings generalize across ecosystems, and whether non-trophic interactions affect food webs randomly or affect specific trophic levels or functional groups.

== History ==
Although biological interactions, more or less individually, were studied earlier, Edward Haskell in 1949 gave an integrative approach to the thematic, proposing a classification of "co-actions", later adopted by biologists as "interactions". Close and long-term interactions are described as symbiosis; (Note: Symbiosis was formerly used to mean a mutualism.) symbioses that are mutually beneficial are called mutualistic.

The term symbiosis was subject to a century-long debate about whether it should specifically denote mutualism, as in lichens or in parasites that benefit themselves. This debate created two different classifications for biotic interactions, one based on the time (long-term and short-term interactions) and other based on the magnitude of interaction force (competition/mutualism) or effect of individual fitness, under the stress gradient hypothesis and Mutualism Parasitism Continuum. Evolutionary game theory such as Red Queen hypothesis, Red King hypothesis, or Black Queen hypothesis has demonstrated a classification based on the force of interaction is important.

== Classification based on time of interaction ==
=== Short-term interactions ===
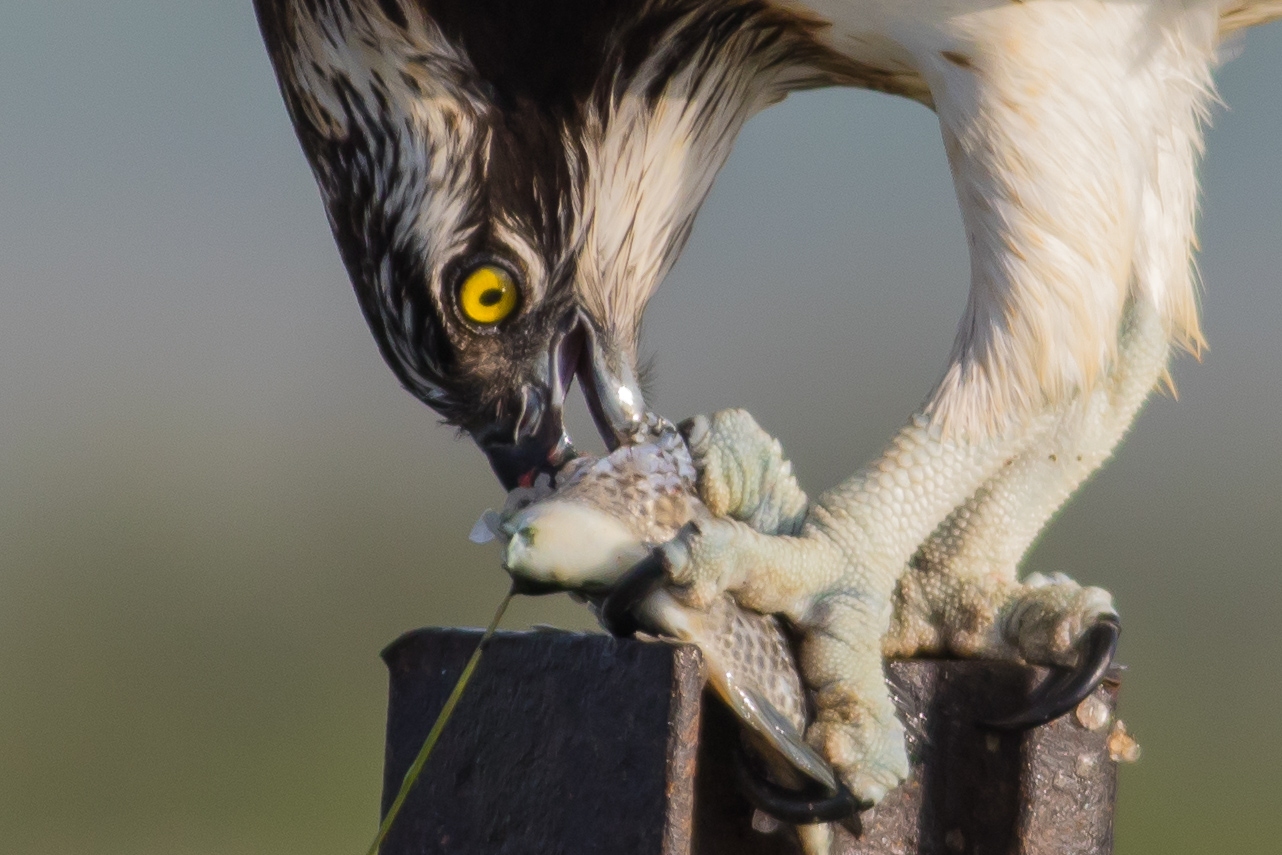
Predation is a short-term interaction, in which the predator, here an osprey, kills and eats its prey.

Short-term interactions, including predation and pollination, are extremely important in ecology and evolution. These are short-lived in terms of the duration of a single interaction: a predator kills and eats a prey; a pollinator transfers pollen from one flower to another; but they are extremely durable in terms of their influence on the evolution of both partners. As a result, the partners coevolve.

==== Predation ====
In predation, one organism, the predator, kills and eats another organism, its prey. Predators are adapted and often highly specialized for hunting, with acute senses such as vision, hearing, or smell. Many predatory animals, both vertebrate and invertebrate, have sharp claws or jaws to grip, kill, and cut up their prey. Other adaptations include stealth and aggressive mimicry that improve hunting efficiency. Predation has a powerful selective effect on prey, causing them to develop antipredator adaptations such as warning coloration, alarm calls and other signals, camouflage and defensive spines and chemicals. Predation has been a major driver of evolution since at least the Cambrian period.

==== Pollination ====
Pollination has driven the coevolution of flowering plants and their animal pollinators for over 100 million years.

In pollination, pollinators including insects (entomophily), some birds (ornithophily), and some bats, transfer pollen from a male flower part to a female flower part, enabling fertilisation, in return for a reward of pollen or nectar. The partners have coevolved through geological time; in the case of insects and flowering plants, the coevolution has continued for over 100 million years. Insect-pollinated flowers are adapted with shaped structures, bright colours, patterns, scent, nectar, and sticky pollen to attract insects, guide them to pick up and deposit pollen, and reward them for the service. Pollinator insects like bees are adapted to detect flowers by colour, pattern, and scent, to collect and transport pollen (such as with bristles shaped to form pollen baskets on their hind legs), and to collect and process nectar (in the case of honey bees, making and storing honey). The adaptations on each side of the interaction match the adaptations on the other side, and have been shaped by natural selection on their effectiveness of pollination.

==== Seed dispersal ====
Seed dispersal is the movement, spread or transport of seeds away from the parent plant. Plants have limited mobility and rely upon a variety of dispersal vectors to transport their propagules, including both abiotic vectors such as the wind and living (biotic) vectors like birds. Seeds can be dispersed away from the parent plant individually or collectively, as well as dispersed in both space and time. The patterns of seed dispersal are determined in large part by the dispersal mechanism and this has important implications for the demographic and genetic structure of plant populations, as well as migration patterns and species interactions. There are five main modes of seed dispersal: gravity, wind, ballistic, water, and by animals. Some plants are serotinous and only disperse their seeds in response to an environmental stimulus. Dispersal involves the letting go or detachment of a diaspore from the main parent plant.

=== Long-term interactions (symbioses) ===
The six possible types of symbiotic relationship, from mutual benefit to mutual harm

The six possible types of symbiosis are mutualism, commensalism, parasitism, neutralism, amensalism, and competition. These are distinguished by the degree of benefit or harm they cause to each partner.

==== Mutualism ====
Mutualism is an interaction between two or more species, where species derive a mutual benefit, for example an increased carrying capacity. Similar interactions within a species are known as co-operation. Mutualism may be classified in terms of the closeness of association, the closest being symbiosis, which is often confused with mutualism. One or both species involved in the interaction may be obligate, meaning they cannot survive in the short or long term without the other species. Though mutualism has historically received less attention than other interactions such as predation, it is an important subject in ecology. Examples include cleaning symbiosis, gut flora, Müllerian mimicry, and nitrogen fixation by bacteria in the root nodules of legumes.

==== Commensalism ====
Commensalism benefits one organism and the other organism is neither benefited nor harmed. It occurs when one organism takes benefits by interacting with another organism by which the host organism is not affected. A good example is a remora living with a manatee. Remoras feed on the manatee's faeces. The manatee is not affected by this interaction, as the remora does not deplete the manatee's resources.

==== Parasitism ====
Parasitism is a relationship between species, where one organism, the parasite, lives on or in another organism, the host, causing it some harm, and is adapted structurally to this way of life. The parasite either feeds on the host, or, in the case of intestinal parasites, consumes some of its food.

==== Neutralism ====
Neutralism (a term introduced by Eugene Odum) describes the relationship between two species that interact but do not affect each other. Examples of true neutralism are virtually impossible to prove; the term is in practice used to describe situations where interactions are negligible or insignificant.

==== Amensalism ====
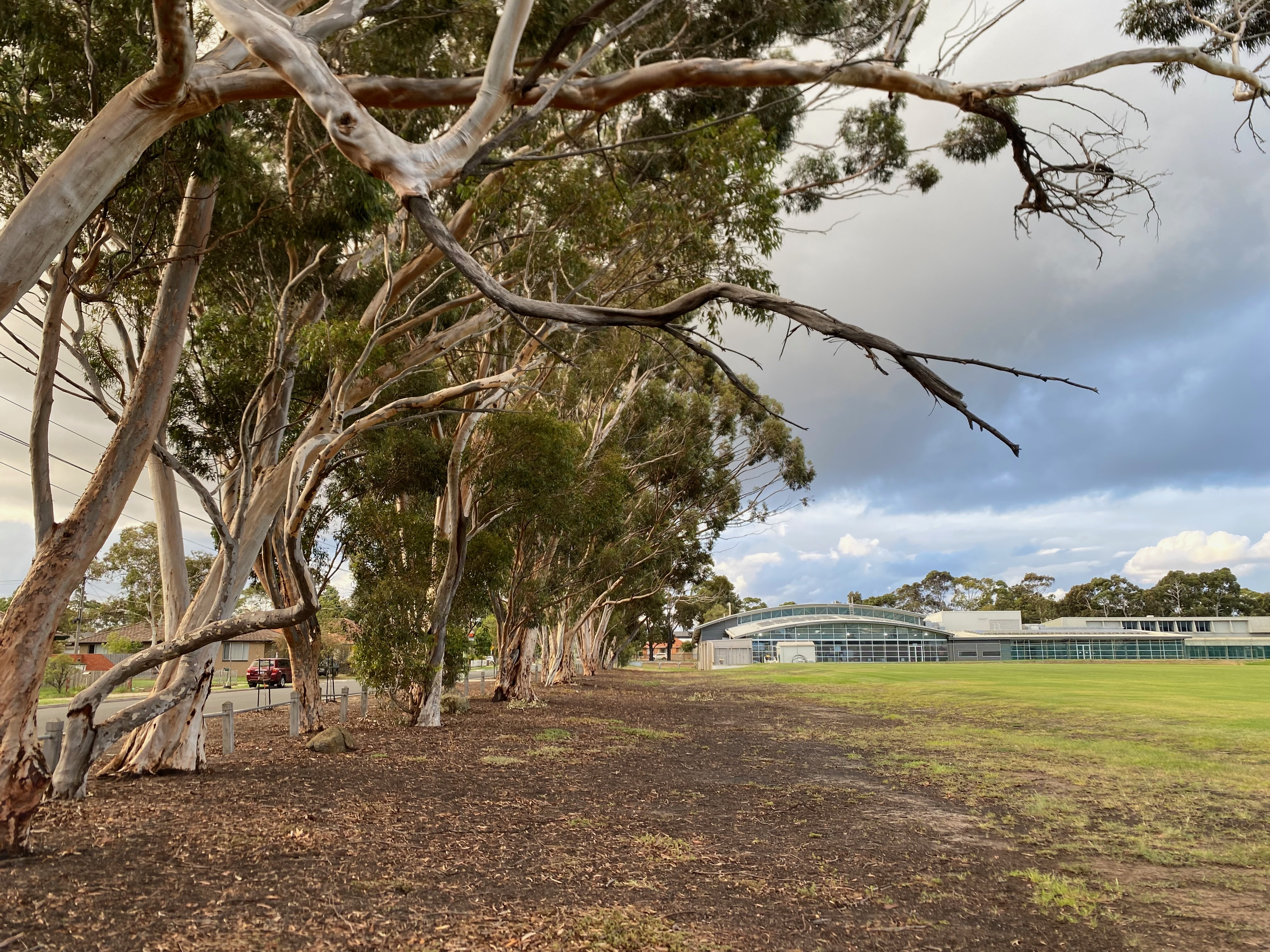
Leaf litter from these eucalypts contains chemicals which inhibit grass growth near the trees

Amensalism (a term introduced by Edward Haskell) is an interaction where an organism inflicts harm to another organism without any costs or benefits received by itself. This unidirectional process can be based on the release of one or more chemical compounds by one organism that negatively affect another, called allelopathy. One example of this is the microbial production of antibiotics that can inhibit or kill other, susceptible microorganisms. Another example is leaf litter from trees such as Pinus ponderosa or Eucalyptus spp. preventing the establishment and growth of other plant species.

A clear case of amensalism is where hoofed mammals trample grass. Whilst the presence of the grass causes negligible detrimental effects to the animal's hoof, the grass suffers from being crushed. Amensalism also includes strongly asymmetrical competitive interactions, such as has been observed between the Spanish ibex and weevils of the genus Timarcha, which both feed upon the same type of shrub. Whilst the presence of the weevil has almost no influence on food availability, the presence of ibex has an enormous detrimental effect on weevil numbers, as they eat the shrub and incidentally ingest the weevils.

==== Competition ====
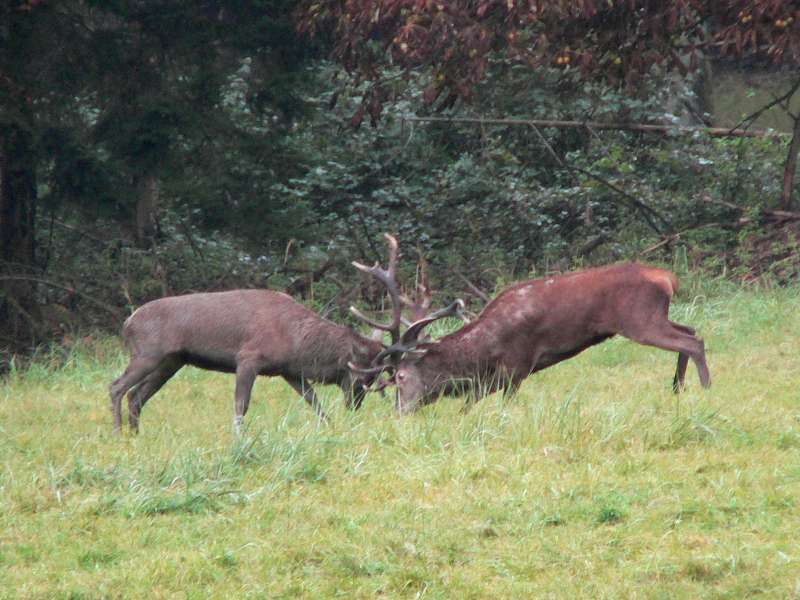
Male-male interference competition in red deer

Competition can be defined as an interaction between organisms or species, in which the fitness of one is lowered by the presence of another. Competition is often for a resource such as food, water, or territory in limited supply, or for access to females for reproduction. Competition among members of the same species is known as intraspecific competition, while competition between individuals of different species is known as interspecific competition. According to the competitive exclusion principle, species less suited to compete for resources should either adapt or die out. This competition within and between species for resources plays a critical role in natural selection.

== Classification based on effect on fitness ==
Biotic interactions can vary in intensity (strength of interaction), and frequency (number of interactions in a given time). There are direct interactions when there is contact between individuals or indirect interactions when there is none; that is, the interaction occurs with a resource, ecological service, toxin, or growth inhibitor. The interactions can be directly determined by individuals (incidentally) or by stochastic processes (accidentally), for instance side effects that one individual has on other. They are divided into six major types: competition, antagonism, amensalism, neutralism, commensalism, and mutualism.

== Non-trophic interactions ==
Some examples of non-trophic interactions are habitat modification, mutualism and competition for space. It has been suggested recently that non-trophic interactions can indirectly affect food web topology and trophic dynamics by affecting the species in the network and the strength of trophic links. It is necessary to integrate trophic and non-trophic interactions in ecological network analyses. The few empirical studies that address this suggest food web structures (network topologies) can be strongly influenced by species interactions outside the trophic network. However these studies include only a limited number of coastal systems, and it remains unclear to what extent these findings can be generalized. Whether non-trophic interactions typically affect specific species, trophic levels, or functional groups within the food web, or, alternatively, indiscriminately mediate species and their trophic interactions throughout the network has yet to be resolved. sessile species with generally low trophic levels seem to benefit more than others from non-trophic facilitation, though facilitation benefits higher trophic and more mobile species as well.

== See also ==
- Altruism (biology)
- Animal sexual behaviour
- Biological pump, interaction between marine animals and carbon forms
- Cheating (biology)
- Collective animal behavior
- Detritivory
- Epibiont
- Evolving digital ecological network
- Food chain
- Kin selection
- Microbial cooperation
- Microbial loop
- Quorum sensing
- Spite (game theory)
- Swarm behaviour
