= Mutualism Parasitism Continuum =

The hypothesis or paradigm of Mutualism Parasitism Continuum postulates that compatible host-symbiont associations can occupy a broad continuum of interactions with different fitness outcomes for each member.

At one end of the continuum lies obligate mutualism where both host and symbiont benefit from the interaction and are dependent on it for survival. At the other end of the continuum highly parasitic interactions can occur, where one member gains a fitness benefit at the expense of the others survival. Between these extremes many different types of interaction are possible.

The degree of change between mutualism or parasitism varies depending on the availability of resources, where there is environmental stress generated by few resources, symbiotic relationships are formed while in environments where there is an excess of resources, biological interactions turn to competition and parasitism.

Classically the transmission mode of the symbiont can also be important in predicting where on the mutualism-parasitism-continuum an interaction will sit. Symbionts that are vertically transmitted (inherited symbionts) frequently occupy mutualism space on the continuum, this is due to the aligned reproductive interests between host and symbiont that are generated under vertical transmission. In some systems increases in the relative contribution of horizontal transmission can drive selection for parasitism.

Studies of this hypothesis have focused on host-symbiont models of plants and fungi, and also of animals and microbes.

== See also ==
- Red King Hypothesis
- Red Queen Hypothesis
- Black Queen Hypothesis
- Biological interaction
