= Red King hypothesis =

Evolutionary theory

The Red King hypothesis, proposed by Carl Bergstrom and Michael Lachmann in 2003, contrasts with the Red Queen hypothesis, where mutualistic and cooperative interactions favor the fitness of a set of individuals through slow evolution, as opposed to having competitive interactions or having an "arms race". The hypothesis posits that individuals from different communities can establish positive interactions for long periods of time when there is a great benefit for both parties, also through mutual help, individuals from different species (communities) can share different tasks to build a niche (Black Queen hypothesis), which avoid spending energy in competing and increasing their resilience over environmental stress.

The types of interaction between species determine how fast they coevolve: parasites and their hosts are thought to co-evolve more rapidly, while partners in a mutualistic relationship are thought to evolve more slowly.

The Red King effect drives slower-evolving species to obtain a higher proportion of long-term benefits compared to competing fast-evolving species.

It has been described that the effects of Red Queen and Red King can switch with each other at the convenience of the species, their effects also vary during the life time of populations, so the changes are also reflected in their evolution rates.

An attempt has been made to identify why there is a switch between Red Queen and Red King effects and some studies have postulated that it is mainly due to environmental variables such as access to resources and environmental conditions, as postulated by the stress gradient hypothesis and the mutualism-parasitism continuum hypothesis.

An example of the Red King hypothesis is the microbialite and coral communities that are assemblages of different species that can persist for thousands of years as well as some facilitating organisms such as desert plants and mycorrhizae.

== See also ==
- Coevolution
