= BQH =

BQH or bqh may refer to:

- Black Queen hypothesis, a reductive evolution theory which seeks to explain how natural selection can drive gene loss
- BQH, the IATA code for London Biggin Hill Airport, London, England
- bqh, the ISO 639-3 code for Baima language, Sichuan and Gansu Province, China
