= Cheating (biology) =

Exploitive behavior in behavioral ecology

Cheating is a term used in behavioral ecology and ethology to describe behavior whereby organisms receive a benefit at the cost of other organisms. Cheating is common in many mutualistic and altruistic relationships. A cheater is an individual who does not cooperate (or cooperates less than their fair share) but can potentially gain the benefit from others cooperating. Cheaters are also those who selfishly use common resources to maximize their individual fitness at the expense of a group. Natural selection favors cheating, but there are mechanisms to regulate it. The stress gradient hypothesis states that facilitation, cooperation, or mutualism should be more common in stressful environments, while cheating, competition, or parasitism are common in benign environments (such as nutrient excess).

== Theoretical models ==
Organisms communicate and cooperate to perform a wide range of behaviors. Mutualism, or mutually beneficial interactions between species, is common in ecological systems. These interactions can be thought of "biological markets" in which species offer partners goods that are relatively inexpensive for them to produce and receive goods that are more expensive or even impossible for them to produce. However, these systems provide opportunities for exploitation by individuals that can obtain resources while providing nothing in return. Exploiters can take on several forms: individuals outside a mutualistic relationship who obtain a commodity in a way that confers no benefit to either mutualist, individuals who receive benefits from a partner but have lost the ability to give any in return, or individuals who have the option of behaving mutualistically towards their partners but chose not to do so.

Cheaters, who do not cooperate but benefit from others who do cooperate gain a competitive edge. In an evolutionary context, this competitive edge refers to a greater ability to survive or to reproduce. If individuals who cheat are able to gain survivorship and reproductive benefits while incurring no costs, natural selection should favor cheaters. However, mechanisms also exist that prevent cheaters from undermining mutualistic systems. One main factor is that the advantages of cheating are often frequency-dependent. Frequency-dependent selection occurs when the fitness of a phenotype depends on its frequency relative to other phenotypes in a population. Cheater phenotypes often display negative frequency-dependent selection, where fitness increases as a phenotype becomes less common and vice versa. In other words, cheaters do best (in terms of evolutionary benefits such as increased survival and reproduction) when there are relatively few of them, but as cheaters become more abundant they do worse.

For example, in Escherichia coli colonies, there are antibiotic-sensitive "cheaters" that persist at low numbers on antibiotic-laced mediums when in a cooperative colony. These cheaters enjoy the benefit of others producing antibiotic-resistant agents while producing none themselves. However, as numbers increase, if they persist in not producing the antibiotic agent themselves, they are more likely to be negatively impacted by the antibiotic substrate because there is less antibiotic agent to protect everyone. Thus, cheaters can persist in a population because their exploitative behavior gives them an advantage when they exist at low frequencies but these benefits are diminished when they are greater in number.

Others have proposed that cheating (exploitive behavior) can stabilize cooperation in mutualistic systems. In many mutualistic systems, there will be feedback benefits to those that cooperate. For instance, the fitness of both partners may be improved. If there is a high reward or many benefits for the individual that initiated the cooperative behavior, mutualism should be selected for. When researchers investigated the co-evolution of cooperation and choice in a choosy host and its symbiont (an organism that lives in a relationship that benefits all parties involved), their model indicated that although choice and cooperation may be initially selected for, this would often be unstable. In other words, one cooperative partner will choose another cooperative partner if given a choice. However, if this choice is made over and over, variation is removed and this selection can no longer be maintained. This situation is similar to the lek paradox in female choice. For example, in lek paradox, if females consistently choose for a particular male trait, genetic variance for that trait should eventually be eliminated, removing the benefits of choice. However, that choice somehow still persists.

One theory states that cheating maintains genetic variation in the face of selection for mutualism. One study shows that a small influx of immigrants with a tendency to cooperate less can generate enough genetic variability to stabilize selection for mutualism. This suggests that the presence of exploitive individuals, otherwise known as cheaters, contribute enough genetic variation to maintain mutualism itself. Both this theory and the negative frequency-dependent theory suggest that that cheating exists as part of a stable mixed evolutionary strategy with mutualism. In other words, cheating is a stable strategy used by individuals in a population where many other individuals cooperate. Another study supports that cheating can exist as a mixed strategy with mutualism using a mathematical game model. Thus, cheating can arise and be maintained in mutualistic populations.

== Examples ==
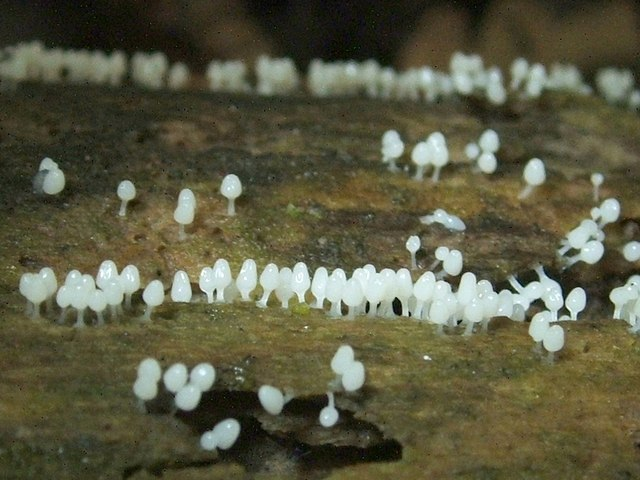
Stalked slime mould fruiting bodies

Studies of cheating and dishonest communication in populations presupposes an organismal system that cooperates. Without a collective population that has signaling and interactions among individuals, behaviors such as cheating do not manifest. In other words, in order to study cheating behavior, a model system that engages in cooperation is needed. Models that provide insight on cheating include the social amoeba Dictyostelium discoideum; eusocial insects, such as ants, bees, and wasps; and inter-specific interactions found in cleaning mutualisms. Common examples of cleaning mutualisms include cleaner fish such as wrasses and gobies, and some cleaner shrimp.

=== In Dictyostelium discoideum ===
Dictyostelium discoideum is a widely used model for cooperation and the development of multicellularity. This species of amoeba is most commonly found in a haploid, single-celled state that feeds independently and undergoes asexual reproduction. However, when the scarcity of food sources causes individual cells to starve, roughly 10⁴ to 10⁵ cells aggregate to form a mobile, multicellular structure dubbed a "slug". In the wild, aggregates generally contain multiple genotypes, resulting in chimeric mixtures. Unlike clonal (genetically identical) aggregates typically found in multicellular organisms, the potential for competition exists in chimeric aggregates. For example, because individuals in the aggregate contain different genomes, differences in fitness can result in conflict of interest among cells in the aggregate, where different genotypes could potentially compete against each other for resources and reproduction. In Dictyostelium discoideum, roughly 20% of the cells in the aggregate become dead to make the stalk of a fruiting body. The remaining 80% of cells become spores in the sorus of the fruiting body, which can germinate again once conditions are more favorable. In this case, 20% of the cells must give up reproduction so that the fruiting body forms successfully. This makes chimeric aggregates of Dictyostelium discoideum susceptible to cheating individuals that take advantage of the reproductive behavior without paying the fair price. In other words, if certain individuals tend to become a part of the sorus more frequently, they can gain increased benefit from the fruiting body system without sacrificing their own opportunities to reproduce. Cheating behavior in D. discoideum is well established, and many studies have attempted to elucidate the evolutionary and genetic mechanisms underlying the behavior. Having a 34Mb genome that is completely sequenced and well annotated makes D. discoideum a useful model in studying the genetic bases and molecular mechanisms of cheating, and in a broader sense, social evolution.

=== In eusocial insects ===
Eusocial insects also serve as valuable tools in studying cheating. Eusocial insects behave cooperatively, where members of the community forgo reproduction to assist a few individuals to reproduce. Such model systems have potential for conflict of interest to arise among individuals, and thus also have potential for cheating to occur. Eusocial insects in the order Hymenoptera, which includes bees and wasps, exhibit good examples of conflicts of interest present in insect societies. In these systems, queen bees and wasps can mate and lay fertilized eggs that hatch into females. On the other hand, workers of most species in Hymenoptera can produce eggs, but cannot produce fertilized eggs due to loss of mating ability. Workers that lay eggs represent a cost for the colony because workers that lay eggs often do significantly less work, and thus negatively impact the health of the colony (for example: decreased amount of collected food, or less attention given to tending the queen's eggs). In this case, a conflict of interest arises between the workers and the colony. The workers should lay eggs in order to pass on their genes; however, as a colony, having only the queen reproduce leads to better productivity. If workers sought to pass their own genes by laying eggs, foraging activities would diminish, leading to decreased resources for the entire colony. This, in turn, can cause a tragedy of the commons, where selfish behavior lead to the depletion of resources, with long-term negative consequences for the group. However, in natural bee and wasp societies, only 0.01–0.1% and 1%, respectively, of the workers lay eggs, suggesting that strategies exist to combat cheating to prevent tragedy of the commons. These insect systems have given scientists opportunities to study strategies that keep cheating in check. Such strategies are commonly referred to as "policing" strategies, generally where additional costs are imposed on cheaters to discourage or eliminate cheating behaviors. For example, honeybees and wasps may eat eggs produced by workers. In some ant species and yellowjackets, policing may occur via aggression towards or killing egg-laying individuals to minimize cheating.

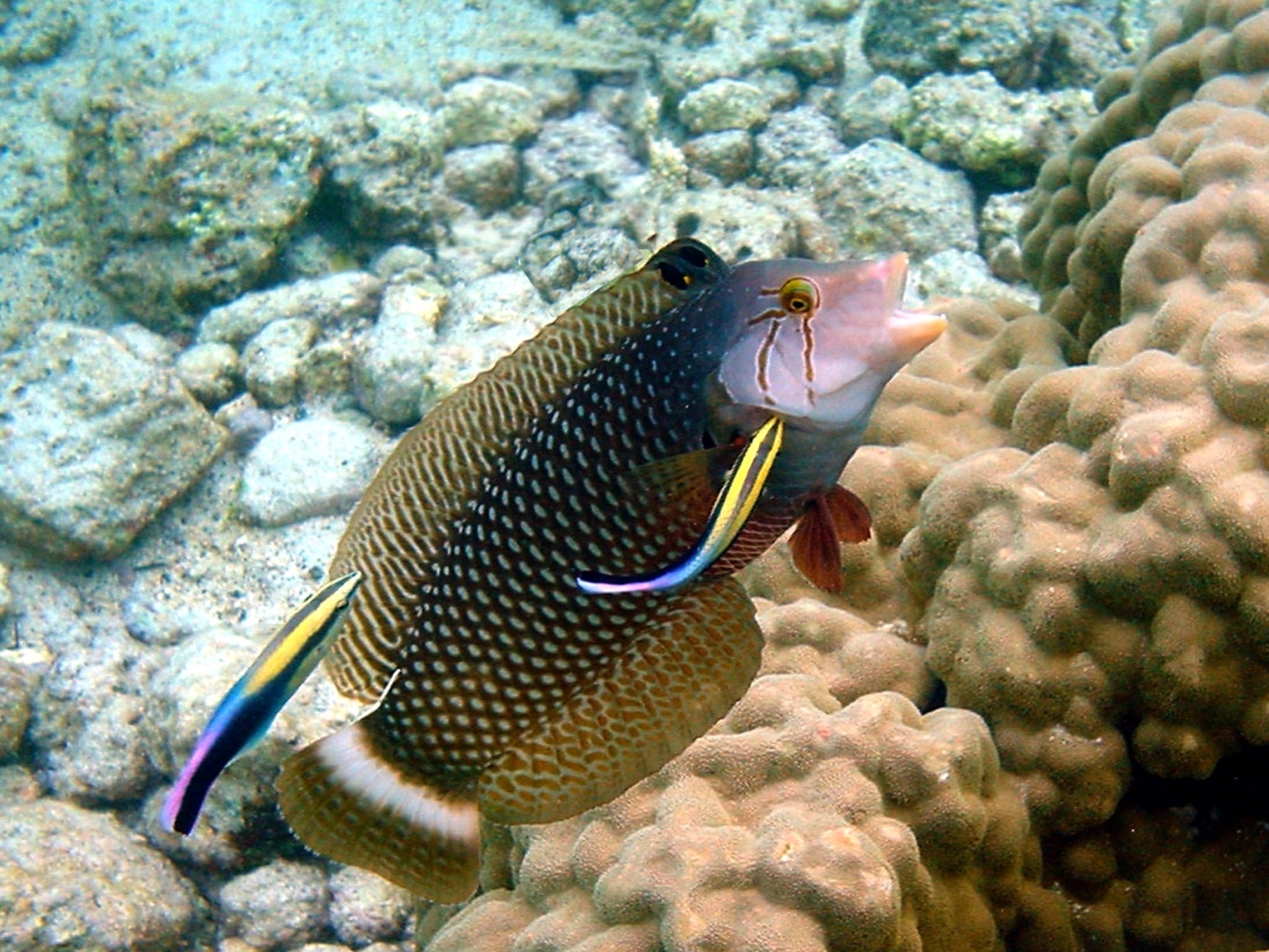
Fish cleaned by smaller cleaner wrasses on Hawaiian reefs

=== In cleaning symbiosis ===
Cleaning symbiosis that develop between small and larger marine organisms often represent models useful for studying the evolution of stable social interactions and cheating. In the cleaning fish Labroides dimidiatus (bluestreak cleaner wrasse), as in many cleaner species, the client fish seeks to have ectoparasites removed by the cleaners. In these situations, instead of picking off the parasites on the surface of the client fish, the cleaner can cheat by feeding on the client's tissue (mucus layer, scales, etc.), thereby gaining additional benefit from the symbiotic system. It has been well documented that cleaners will feed on mucus when their clients are unable to control the cleaner's behavior; however, in natural settings, client fish often jolt, chase after cheating cleaners, or terminate interactions by swimming away, effectively controlling the cheating behavior. Studies on cleaning mutualisms generally suggest that cheating behavior is often adjusted depending on the species of the client. In cleaning shrimp, cheating is predicted to occur less often because shrimps bear a higher cost if the clients use aggression to control the cleaner's behavior. Studies have found that cleaner species can strategically adjust cheating behavior according to the potential associated risk. For example, predatory clients, which present a significantly high cost for cheating, experience less cheating behavior. On the other hand, nonpredatory clients present a lower cost for cheating, and thus experience more cheating behaviors from the cleaners. Some evidence suggest that physiological processes can mediate the cleaners' decision to switch from cooperating to cheating in mutualistic interactions. For example, in the bluestreak cleaner wrasse, changes in cortisol levels are associated with behavior changes. For smaller clients, increase cortisol levels in the water lead to more cooperative behavior, while for larger clients, the same treatment lead to more dishonest behavior. It has been suggested that "good behavior" toward smaller clients often allow wrasses to attract larger clients that are often cheated.

=== Other ===
Other models of cheating include the European tree frog Hyla arborea. In many sexually reproducing species such as this, some males can access mates by exploiting resources of more competitive males. Many species have dynamic reproductive strategies that can change in response to changes in the environment. In these instances, several factors contribute to the decision to switch between mating strategies. For example, in the European tree frog, a sexually competitive (as in, perceived to be attractive by females) male tend to call to attract mates. This is often referred to as the "bourgeois" tactic. On the other hand, a smaller male that would likely fail to attract mates using the bourgeois tactic will tend to hide near attractive males and attempt to access females. In this instance, the males can gain access to females without having to defend territories or acquiring additional resources (which often serve as the basis for attractiveness). This is referred to as the "parasitic" tactic, where the smaller male effectively cheats its way to accessing females, by reaping the benefit of sexual reproduction without contributing resources that normally attract females. Models such as this provide valuable tools for research aimed at energetic constraints and environmental cues involved in cheating. Studies find that mating strategies are highly adaptable and depend on a variety of factors, such as competitiveness, energetic costs involved in defending territory or acquiring resources.

== Constraints and countermeasures ==
=== Resource spending between microbes ===
Like many other organisms, bacteria rely on iron intake for its biological processes. However, iron is sometimes difficult to access in certain environments, like soil. Some bacteria have evolved siderophores, iron-chelating particles that seek and bring back iron for the bacteria. Siderophores are not necessarily specific to its producer—sometimes another individual could take up the particles instead. Pseudomonas fluorescens is a bacterium commonly found in the soil. Under low-iron conditions, P. fluorescens produces siderophores, specifically pyoverdine, to retrieve the iron necessary for survival. However, when iron is readily available, either from freely diffusing in environment or another bacterium's siderophores, P. fluorescens ceases production, allowing the bacterium to devote its energy towards growth. One study showed that when P. fluorescens grew in association with Streptomyces ambofaciens, another bacterium that produces the siderophore coelichelin, no pyoverdine was detected. This result suggested that P. fluorescens ceased siderophore production in favor of taking up iron-bound coelichelin, an association also known as siderophore piracy.

More studies, however, suggested that P. fluorescens' cheating behavior could be suppressed. In another study, two strains of P. fluorescens were studied in the soil, their natural environment. One strain, known as the producer, produced a higher level of siderophores, which meant that other strain, known as the non-producer, ceased siderophore production in favor of using the other's siderophores. Although one would expect that the non-producer would outcompete the producer, like the P. fluorescens and S. ambofaciens association, the study demonstrated that the non-producer was unable to do so in soil conditions, suggesting that the two strains could coexist. Further experiments suggested that this cheating prevention may be due to interactions with other microbes in the soil influencing the relationship or the spatial structure of the soil preventing siderophore diffusion and therefore limiting the non-producer's ability to exploit the producer's siderophores.

=== Selection pressure in Pseudomonas aeruginosa ===
By definition, individuals cheat to gain benefits that their non-cheating counterparts do not receive. This raises the question of how a cooperative system can exist in face of these cheaters. One answer is that the cheaters actually have a reduced fitness compared to the non-cheaters.

In a study by Dandekar et al., the researchers examined the survival rates of cheating and non-cheating bacteria populations (Pseudomonas aeruginosa) under varying environmental conditions. These microorganisms, like many species of bacteria, use a cell-cell communication system called quorum sensing that detect their population density and prompt the transcription of various resources when needed. In this case, the resources are publicly shared proteases that break down a food source like casein, and privately used adenosine hydrolase, which breaks down another food source, adenosine. The problem arises when some individuals ("cheaters") do not respond to these quorum sensing signals and therefore do not contribute to the costly protease production yet enjoy the benefits of the broken down resources.

When P. aeruginosa populations are placed into growth conditions where cooperation (and responding to the quorum signal) is costly, the number of cheaters increases, and the public resources are depleted, which can lead to a tragedy of the commons. However, when P. aeruginosa populations are placed into growth conditions with a proportion of adenosine, the cheaters are suppressed because the bacteria that respond to the quorum signal now produce adenosine hydrolase that they privately use for themselves to digest adenosine food source. In wild populations where the presence of adenosine is common, this is an explanation for how individuals that cooperate could have higher fitness than those that cheat, thereby suppressing the cheaters and maintaining cooperation.

=== Policing/punishment in insects ===
Cheating is also commonly found in insects. The social and seemingly altruistic communities found in insects such as ants and bees provide ample opportunities for cheaters to take advantage of the system and accrue additional benefits at the expense of the community.

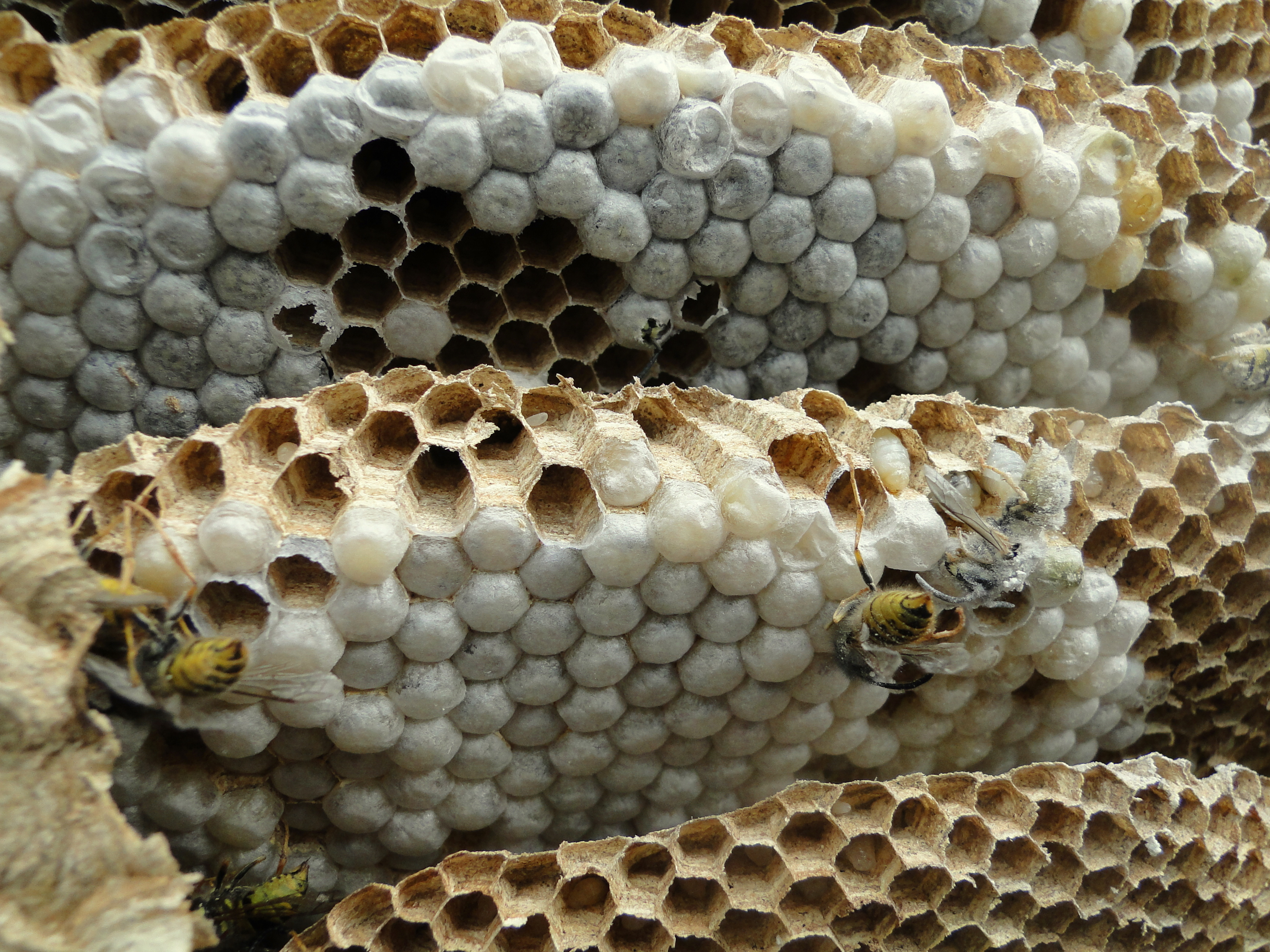
Wasp nest, with some larvae

Sometimes, a colony of insects is called a "superorganism" for its ability to take on properties greater than those of the sum of individuals. A colony of insects in which different individuals are specialized for specific tasks means a greater colony production and greater efficiency. Moreover, based on the kin-selection theory, it is collectively beneficial for all the individuals in the community to have the queen lay eggs rather than the workers lay eggs. This is because if the workers lay eggs, it benefits the egg-laying worker individually, but the rest of the workers are now twice removed from this worker's offspring. Therefore, though it is beneficial for one individual to have its own offspring, it is collectively beneficial to have the queen lay the eggs. Therefore, a system of worker and queen policing exists against worker-laid eggs.

One form of policing occurs by the oophagy of the worker-laid eggs, found in many ant and bee species. This could be done by both or either the queen or the workers. In a series of experiments with honeybees (Apis mellifera), Ratneiks & Visscher found that other workers effectively removed worker-laid eggs in all colonies, whether the eggs originated from the same colonies or not. An example of a combination of queen and worker policing is found in ants, in the genus Diacamma, in which worker-laid eggs are taken by other workers and fed to the "queen". In general, these signals that identify the eggs as queen-laid are likely incorruptible, since it must be an honest signal to be maintained and not be used by cheating workers.

The other form of policing occurs through aggression towards egg-laying workers. In a species of tree wasp Dolichovespula sylvestris, Wenseleers et al. found that a combination of aggressive behavior and destruction of worker-laid eggs kept the number of worker-laid eggs low. In fact, 91% of the worker-laid eggs were policed within one day. They also found that about 20% of workers laying eggs were prevented from doing so through both the queen's and workers' aggressive behavior. The workers and the queen would grab the egg-laying worker and try to sting her or push her off the cell. This usually results in the worker removing her abdomen and not depositing her eggs.

=== Policing/punishment in other organisms ===
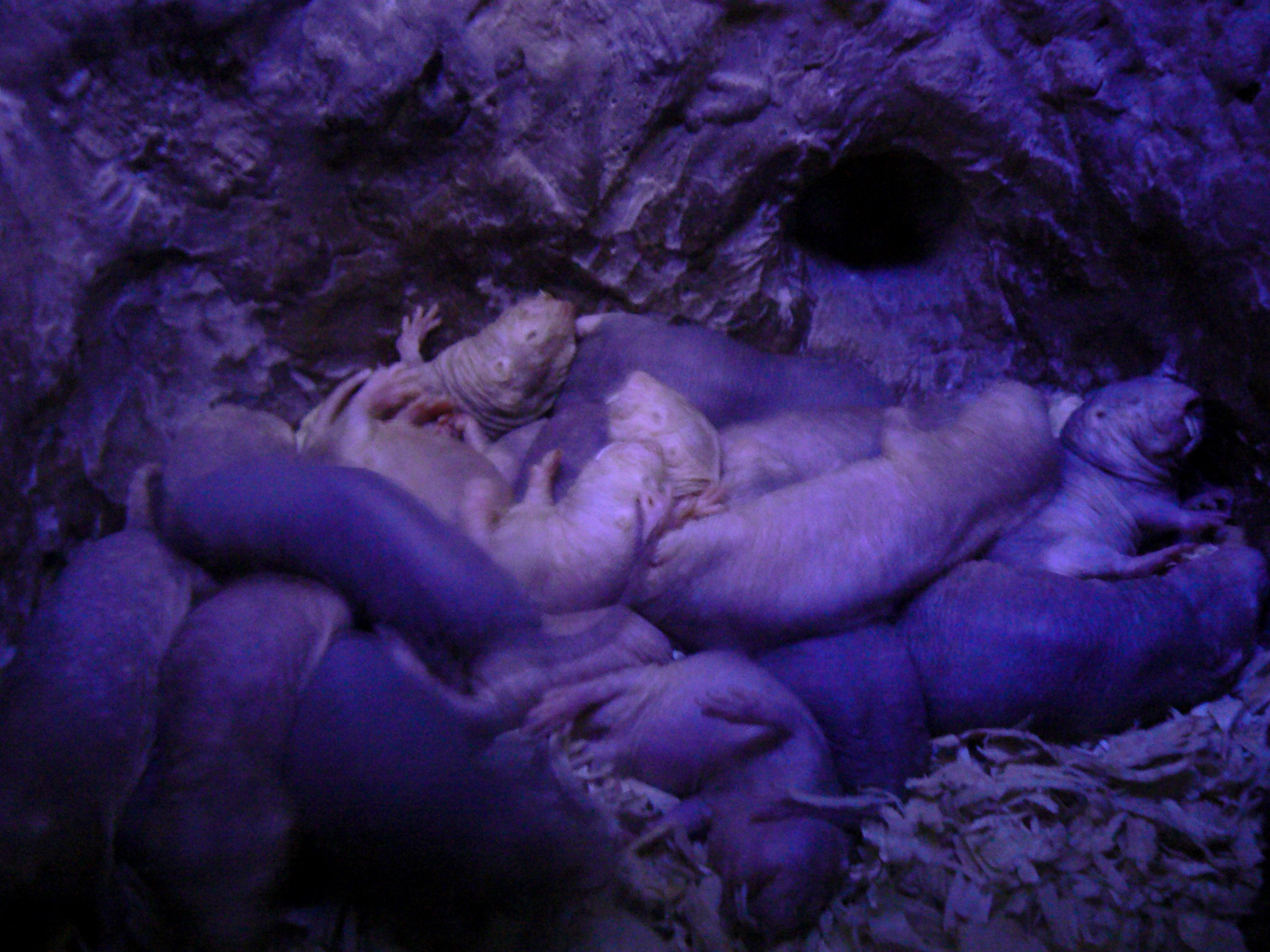
A nest of naked mole rats

Aggression and punishment are not just found in insects. For example, in naked mole-rats, punishments by the queen are a way she motivates the lazier, less-related workers in their groups. The queen would shove the lazier workers, with the number of shoves increasing when there are fewer active workers. Reeve found that if the queen is removed when colonies are satiated, there is a significant drop in weight of the active workers because the lazier workers are taking advantage of the system.

Punishment is also a method used by cichlid Neolamprologous pulcher in their cooperative breeding systems. It is a pay-to-stay system where helper fish are allowed to stay in certain territories in exchange for their help. Similar to the naked mole rats, the helpers that were prevented from helping, the "idle helpers", receive more aggression than control helpers in the study. Researchers theorize that this system developed because the fish are usually not closely related (so kinship benefits have little impact), and because there is a high level of predation risk when the fish is outside the group (therefore a strong motivator for the helper fish to stay in the group).

Rhesus monkeys also use aggression as a punishment. These animals have five distinct calls that they can "decide" to produce upon finding food. Whether they call or not is related to their sex and number of kin: females call more often and females with more kin call more often. However, sometimes when food is found, the individual ("discoverer") does not call to attract its kin and, presumably, to share food. If lower-ranked individuals find this discoverer to be in the food drop area of the experiment, they recruit coalition support against this individual by screaming. The formed coalition then chases this individual away. If higher-ranked individuals find this discoverer, they either chase the discoverer away or became aggressive towards the individual. These results show that aggression as punishment is a way to encourage members to work together and share food when it is found.

=== Interspecific countermeasures ===
Cheating and constraints of cheating are not limited to intraspecific interactions; it can also occur in a mutualistic relationship between two species. A common example is the mutualistic relationship between cleaner fish Labroides dimidiatus and reef fish. Bshary and Grutter found that cleaner wrasse prefers the client tissue mucus over ectoparasites. This creates a conflict between the cleaner fish and reef fish, because the reef fish only benefit when the cleaner fish eats the ectoparasites. Further studies revealed that in a lab setting, the cleaner fish undergoes behavioral change in face of deterrents against eating their preferential food. In several trials, the plate of their preferential food source was immediately removed when they eat it, to mimic "client fleeing" in natural settings. In other trials, the plate of their preferential food source chased the cleaner fish when they eat it, mimicking "client chasing" in natural setting. After only six learning trials, the cleaners learned to choose against their preference, indicating that punishment is potentially a very effective countermeasure against cheating in mutualistic relationships.

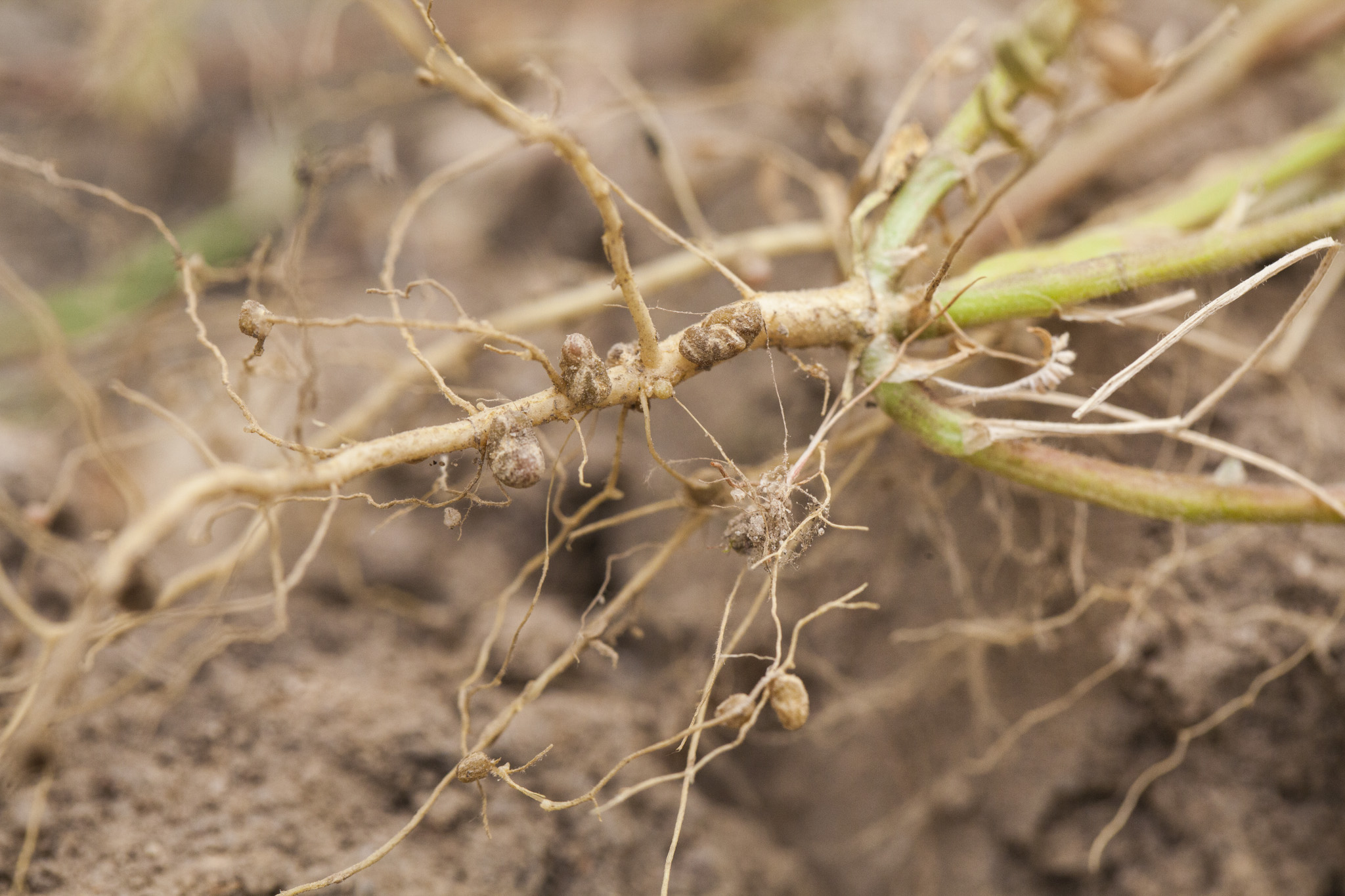
Nitrogen-fixing nodules in legumes

Finally the countermeasures are not limited to organismal relationships. West et al. found a similar countermeasure against cheating in legume-rhizobium mutualism. In this relationship, nitrogen fixing bacteria rhizobium fixes atmospheric N_{2} from inside the roots of leguminous plants, providing this essential source of nitrogen to these plants while also receiving organic acids for themselves. However, some bacteria are more mutualistic, while others are more parasitic because they consume the plant's resources but fix little to no N_{2}. Moreover, these plants cannot tell whether the bacteria are more or less parasitic until they are settled in the plant nodules. To prevent cheating, these plants seem to be able to punish the rhizobium bacteria. In a series of experiments, researchers forced non-cooperation between the bacteria and the plants by placing various nodules in nitrogen-free atmosphere. They saw a decrease in the rhizobium reproductive success by 50%. West et al. created a model for legume sanctioning the bacteria and hypothesizes that these behaviors exist to stabilize mutualistic interactions.

Another well-known example of plant-organism interaction occurs between yuccas and yucca moths. The female yucca moths deposit their eggs one at a time to the yucca flower. At the same time, she also deposits a small amount of pollen from yucca flowers as nutrition for the yucca moths. Because most of the pollen is not consumed by the larva, yucca moths are therefore also the active pollinators for the yucca plant. Moreover, sometimes the female moths do not successfully deposit their eggs the first time, and may try again and again. The yucca plant receives scars from the multiple attempts but also receives more pollen, since the moths are depositing pollen with every try.

"Cheating" sometimes happens when the yucca moth deposits too many eggs in one plant. In this case, the yucca plant has little to no benefit from this interaction. However, the plant has a unique way of constraining this behavior. While the constraint against cheating often occurs directly to the individual, in this case the constraint occurs to the individual's offspring. The yucca plant can "abort" the moths by aborting the flowers. Pellmyr and Huth found that there is selective maturation for flowers that have low egg loads and high number of scars (therefore a high amount of pollen). Thus there is selection against the "cheaters" who try to use the yucca plant without providing the benefits of pollination.
