= Court jester hypothesis =

Hypothesis in evolutionary biology

The court jester hypothesis is used in reference to the idea that abiotic forces (including climate), rather than biotic competition between species, function as a major driving force behind the processes in evolution which produce speciation. In evolutionary theory, the court jester hypothesis contrasts the Red Queen hypothesis.

The term "Court Jester hypothesis" was coined by Anthony Barnosky in 1999 in allusion to the Red Queen hypothesis. In a 2001 paper on the subject, Barnosky uses the term without citation, suggesting that he is the one who coined it. Westfall and Millar attribute the term to him (citing the 2001 paper) in a paper of their own from 2004. Michael Benton also credits Barnosky with coining the phrase.

Since 2001, many researchers in evolution (such as Tracy Aze, Anthony Barnosky, Michael J. Benton, Douglas Erwin, Thomas Ezard, Sergey Gravilets, J.B.C. Jackson, Paul N. Pearson, Andy Purvis, Robert D. Westfall, and Constance I. Millar) have started to use the term "Court Jester hypothesis" to describe the view that evolution at a macro scale is driven by abiotic factors more than the biotic competition called the Red Queen hypothesis. One example of Court Jester dynamics is the correlation between global temperatures and diversification rates in birds.

== Content of hypothesis ==
The court jester hypothesis builds upon the punctuated equilibrium theory of Stephen Gould (1972) by providing a primary mechanism for it. The 2001 paper by Barnosky that is one of the first to use the term appropriate for the Court Jester side of the debate: the Stability hypothesis of Stenseth and Maynard Smith (1984), Vrba's Habitat Theory (1992), Vrba's Turn-over pulse hypothesis (1985), Vrba's Traffic light hypothesis and Relay Model (1995), Gould's Tiers of Time (1985), Brett and Baird's Coordinated Stasis (1995), and Graham and Lundelius' Coevolutionary Disequilibrium (1984) theories.

Barnosky's 2001 paper that was one of the first to introduce the term, explains what the Court Jester hypothesis means, describing it as one side of a debate over:

"[W]hether this march of morphology and species compositions through time, so well documented not only for mammals but throughout the fossil record, is more strongly influenced by interactions among species (Red Queen hypotheses), or by random perturbations to the physical environment such as climate change, tectonic events, or even bolide impacts that change the ground rules for the biota (Court Jester hypotheses). . . . A class of alternative ideas, here termed Court Jester hypotheses, share the basic tenet that changes in the physical environment rather than biotic interactions themselves are the initiators of major changes in organisms and ecosystems. . . . Court Jester hypotheses imply that events random in respect to the biota occasionally change the rules on the biotic playing field. Accelerated biotic response (relative to background rates) is the result."

The Red Queen hypothesis (focusing on evolution by biotic interactions) and Court Jester hypothesis (focusing on evolution by abiotic factors such as stochastic environmental perturbations) both influence coevolutionary switching in host-parasite interactions. Barnosky acknowledges in the 2001 paper that the Court Jester hypothesis is not necessarily inconsistent with the Red Queen hypothesis:

"Indeed, as Ned Johnson remarked (after listening to a lecture expressing these ideas), Maybe it is time for the Court Jester to marry the Red Queen. That is, perhaps the dichotomy between the two hypotheses is really a dichotomy of scale, and that as we look for ways to travel across biological levels, we will find ways to resolve the dichotomies."

== The Red Queen Hypothesis ==
The Red Queen Hypothesis is a term coined by Leigh Van Valen, in 1973, in a reference to the Lewis Carroll book Through the Looking Glass. It refers in evolution theory to the arms race of evolutionary developments and counter-developments that cause co-evolving species to mutually drive each other to adapt. There is dispute over how strongly evolution at the scale of speciation is driven by these competitions between species, and how much it is driven instead by abiotic factors like meteor strikes and climate change, but there was not an artful metaphor to capture this alternative until one was coined by Anthony Barnosky.
