= Reductive evolution =

Evolutionary biological process

Reductive evolution is a process involving the progressive loss of genes, also known as reductive genomic evolution. This process has occurred across both prokaryotic and eukaryotic organisms, particularly in organisms that live as endosymbionts or parasites. This was also an evolutionary process, evident in the transformation of symbionts into cell organelles, as seen in the origin of mitochondria and chloroplasts, through the symbiogenesis process.

== Mechanisms ==
Two main factors drive gene loss: gene essentiality and environmental variability. When organisms have several genes that perform the same functions, this redundancy makes them dispensable and prone to being lost over time. Environmental changes can also shift which genes are necessary; for instance, a gene in charge of nutrient acquisition may become more expressed in a poor nutrient environment. Once the gene is no longer needed, it may accumulate mutations, become non-functional, and eventually be eliminated from the genome through drift or selection.

Another specific mechanism that can promote gene loss through ecological dependency is the black queen hypothesis, where microorganisms rely on extracellular metabolites produced by other symbiotic microbes in their environment. This circumstance makes the microorganisms dependent on one another by reducing, getting rid of the genes responsible for producing their own metabolites. It can also be a from obligate intracellular organisms that reduce their genomes and become dependent on the host to produce metabolites for the organism to use.

== Examples of reductive evolution ==
=== Bacteria ===
Reductive evolution in symbiont bacteria has been widely studied because their genomes show marked changes compared with their free-living ancestors. In these organisms, gene loss is primarily driven by a neutral process; the small population sizes inside hosts promote the accumulation of deleterious mutations and leading to the progressive loss of non-essential genes.

Both pathogenetic and mutualistic symbiotic bacteria have undergone genome reduction, but they retain different genes according to their ecological roles. Pathogenic bacteria retain genes involved in virulence, whereas mutualistic endosymbiotic keep genes required for synthesizing nutrients that benefit the host.

One of the most studied cases is the parasitic bacterium, Rickettsia prowazekii, which has lost so many essential genes that it cannot survive outside its host. Other mutualistic symbioses, such as Buchnera aphidicola in aphids, and Wolbachia bacteria in Wuchereria bancrofti also exhibited genome reduction and have also been widely studied have all been studied and fully sequenced, which is why they are used as examples of reductive evolution.

=== Fungi ===
Although reduction evolution has been widely studied in bacteria, this process also occurs in fungi, particularly mycorrhizal mutualists. Genomic analyses show that ectomycorrhizal (ECM) fungi have progressively lost many genes specialized in cell wall degradation, known as plant cell wall–degrading enzymes (PCWDEs). Compared with their ancestors, white-rot decayers and brown-rot decayers, ECM fungi retain only about 47% and 77%, respectively.

During the mutualistic association with plants, ECM fungi receive fixed carbohydrates from the host. Because of this nutrient supplementation, they no longer needed the full set of enzymes used by saprotrophic fungi at the same scale; genes focused on the plant cell wall degradation. However, some retained PCWDEs genes are essential, because they allow the fungi colonization in the apoplast area and acquire nutrients from the soil in inorganic and organic forms.

Besides gene loss, ECM fungi have also evolved new genes that support symbiosis. One example is the family of mycorrhiza-induced small secreted proteins (MiSSPs), which play a key role in establishing and maintaining the symbiotic interaction, as shown in species such as Laccaria bicolor.

=== Endosymbiotic theory ===
Endosymbiotic processes involve reductive evolution as a part of the symbiosis between the endosymbiont and the host, and the endosymbiont transitions into an organelle. Progressively, several genes are transferred from the endosymbiont to the host nucleus, while other unnecessary genes are progressively lost.

Serial endosymbiosis

Reductive evolution is the central component of the Endosymbiotic Theory, developed by Lynn Margulis. This theory proposes that mitochondria originated from an alphaproteobacterial endosymbiont that became an organelle within the ancestral archaea.

A second major example of reductive evolution through endosymbiosis is the origin of the plastids. Plastids arose from a primary endosymbiosis, when a protist engulfed a photosynthetic cyanobacterium and giving rise to algae and land plants. Secondary endosymbiosis occurs when a eukaryotic alga that already contains a primary plastid is engulfed by another protist. Examples include Guillardia, cryptophyte algae with a plastid obtained from a red alga, and many diatoms that contain chromophyte algae and oomycetes. Some protists have undergone tertiary endosymbiosis, in which a eukaryote engulfs another eukaryote that has already acquired a secondary plastid. For example, Alexandrium (Dinoflagellate) contains a plastid derived from a secondary endosymbiotic event.

=== Viruses ===
Despite there being different theories as to how viruses originated, one posits that they may have once been small cells that parasitized larger cells. Over time, genes not required by their parasitism were lost. The bacteria rickettsia and chlamydia are living cells that, like viruses, can reproduce only inside host cells. They lend support to this hypothesis, as their dependence on parasitism is likely to have caused the loss of genes that enabled them to survive outside a cell. This is also called the "degeneracy hypothesis".

A slightly different "symbiogenic model" proposed in 2012 hypothesizes that ancient cells coexisted with ancient virocells and that modern-day viruses evolved by genomic reduction. Their phylogenomic timeline places a communal cellular world first. Viruses would then emerge from a primordial cellular stem line by losing genes and complexity over time, with a key point being that the regression occurred before the advent of parasitism, and that the obligate parasitism of these cell-derived viruses developed much later.

== History ==
Whole genome sequences over time have served to corroborate the idea of gene loss in some microbes during symbiosis and also in endosymbiosis. This new information, together with new technologies in phylogenomics to reconstruct ancestral lineages, provided sufficient information for model organisms such as Rickettsia prowazekii and endosymbiotic bacteria related to mitochondria and plastids. Although fossils help establish the timing of endosymbiotic origins, they cannot directly reveal genome reduction, which is inferred primarily from comparative genomic analyses.

== Gene loss identification ==
There are several methods used to identify which genes have been lost by comparing the genomes of modern organisms with those of their ancestors. Common phylogenetic methods include maximum parsimony (MP) or maximum likelihood (ML). These methods use patterns to recreate the evolutionary tree of these species and their gene compositions of the ancient forms, as well as the gene losses and gains along the tree branches, which are then compared to identify the similarity between them.

A widely used model species for studying reduction evolution is Rickettsia prowazekii, an obligate intracellular alphaproteobacterium of some multicellular eukaryotes. Researchers have found through the use of phylogenetic methods that this species has lost between 1254 and 1700 genes in comparison with its ancestor. The genes that were retained are primarily those required for parasitism, while genes involved in the biosynthesis of amino acids and nucleotides were primarily lost. This result confirms the genome changes that can be observed in organisms that depend heavily on their host for key metabolites.

== Sources ==
- Leppard K, Dimmock N, Easton A (2007). Introduction to Modern Virology. Blackwell. ISBN 978-1-4051-3645-7. OCLC 65207057.
- Mahy W, Van Regenmortel MH, eds. (2009). Desk Encyclopedia of General Virology. Academic Press. ISBN 978-0-12-375146-1.
