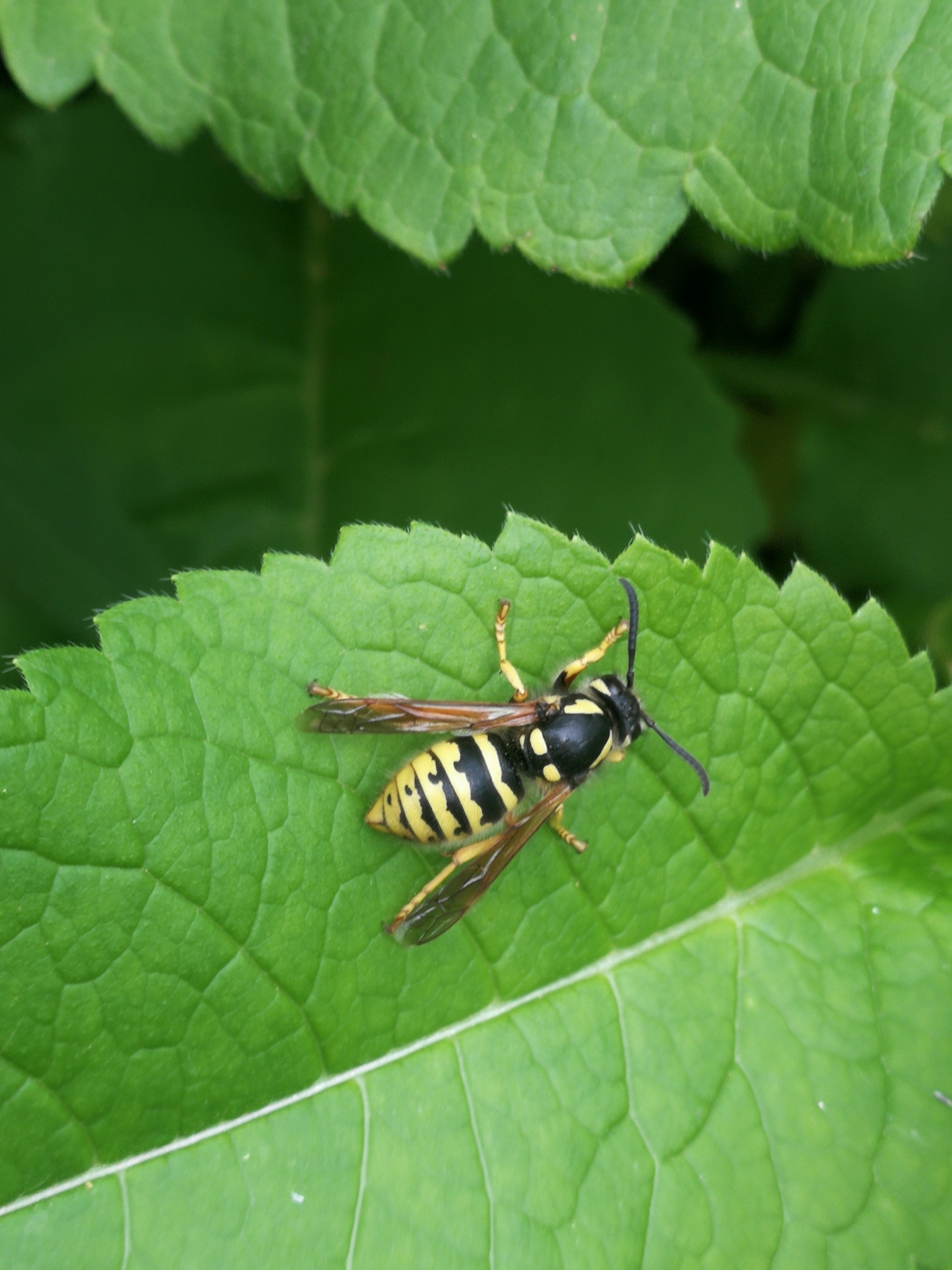
- Dolichovespula omissa queen

Scientific classification
- Kingdom: Animalia
- Phylum: Arthropoda
- Clade: Pancrustacea
- Class: Insecta
- Order: Hymenoptera
- Family: Vespidae
- Genus: Dolichovespula
- Species: D. omissa

Binomial name
- Dolichovespula omissa Bischoff, 1931

= Dolichovespula omissa =

Species of wasp

Dolichovespula omissa is a species of wasp in the family of Vespidae. It lives as a social parasite by letting colonies of Dolichovespula sylvestris raise their young.

The wasps reach a body length of 15 to 18 millimeters (females) or 14 to 16 millimeters (males). Their yellow-black pattern is hardly variable. The males can only be distinguished from the other species of the genus Dolichovespula by details of the genital capsule.

== Occurrence ==
The species occurs from the northern parts of southern Europe to southern Scandinavia and Turkey. It inhabits various open habitats, light forests, and forest margins. It is rare in Central Europe. It flies from mid-June to early September. Young animals of the new generation fly from mid-July onward.

== Naming ==
In other languages common names exist for the species that highlight the social parasitism lifestyle by referencing the cuckoo, which is famous for this behaviour. The German name "Waldkuckuckswespe" and Dutch "Boskoekoekswesp" both translate to "forest cuckoo wasp". In Swedish "Skogssnyltgeting", and Norwegian "Skoggjøkveps" refer to similar concepts.
