= Non-trophic networks =

Biological interaction networks not based on the food chain

Any action or influence that species have on each other is considered a biological interaction. These interactions between species can be considered in several ways. One such way is to depict interactions in the form of a network, which identifies the members and the patterns that connect them. Species interactions are considered primarily in terms of trophic interactions, which depict which species feed on others.

Currently, ecological networks that integrate non-trophic interactions are being built. The type of interactions they can contain can be classified into six categories: mutualism, commensalism, neutralism, amensalism, antagonism, and competition.

Observing and estimating the fitness costs and benefits of species interactions can be very problematic. The way interactions are interpreted can profoundly affect the ensuing conclusions.

== Interaction characteristics ==
Characterization of interactions can be made according to various measures, or any combination of them.

- Prevalence

Prevalence identifies the proportion of the population affected by a given interaction, and thus quantifies whether it is relatively rare or common. Generally, only common interactions are considered.

- Negative/ Positive

Whether the interaction is beneficial or harmful to the species involved determines the sign of the interaction, and what type of interaction it is classified as. To establish whether they are harmful or beneficial, careful observational and/or experimental studies can be conducted, in an attempt to establish the cost/benefit balance experienced by the members.

- Strength

The sign of an interaction does not capture the impact on fitness of that interaction. One example of this is of antagonism, in which predators may have a much stronger impact on their prey species (death), than parasites (reduction in fitness). Similarly, positive interactions can produce anything from a negligible change in fitness to a life or death impact.

- Relationship in space and time

The relationship in space and time is not currently considered within a network structure, though it has been observed by naturalists for centuries. It would be highly informative to include geographical proximity, duration, and seasonal patterns of interactions into network analysis.

== Importance of interactions ==
In the same way that a trophic cascade can occur, it is expected that 'interaction cascades' take place. Thus, it should be possible to construct 'effect' networks which parallel in many ways the energy or matter networks common in the literature. By assessing the network topology and constructing models, we might better understand how interacting species affect each other and how these effects spread through the network. In certain instances, it has been shown that indirect trophic effects tend to dominate direct ones (Patten, 1995)—perhaps this pattern will also emerge in non-trophic interactions.

== Keystone species ==
By analyzing network structures, one can determine keystone species that are of particular importance. A different class of keystone species is what are termed 'ecosystem engineers'. Certain organisms alter the environment so drastically that it affects many interactions that take place within a habitat. This term is used for organisms that "directly or indirectly modulate availability of resources (other than themselves) to other species, by causing physical state changes in biotic or abiotic materials". Beavers are an example of such engineers. Other examples include earthworms, trees, coral reefs, and planktonic organisms. Such 'network engineers' can be seen as "interaction modifiers", meaning that a change in their population density affects the interactions between two or more other species.

== Interesting examples ==
Certain interactions may be particularly problematic to understand. These may include

- Wolbachia
- Beneficial endosymbionts
- Vectors
- Viruses

== Criticisms ==
- Can the complexities of biology ever be captured in schematics?
- How do we accurately detect and evaluate non-visible interactions?
- How much predictive power do these networks have for population dynamics?
