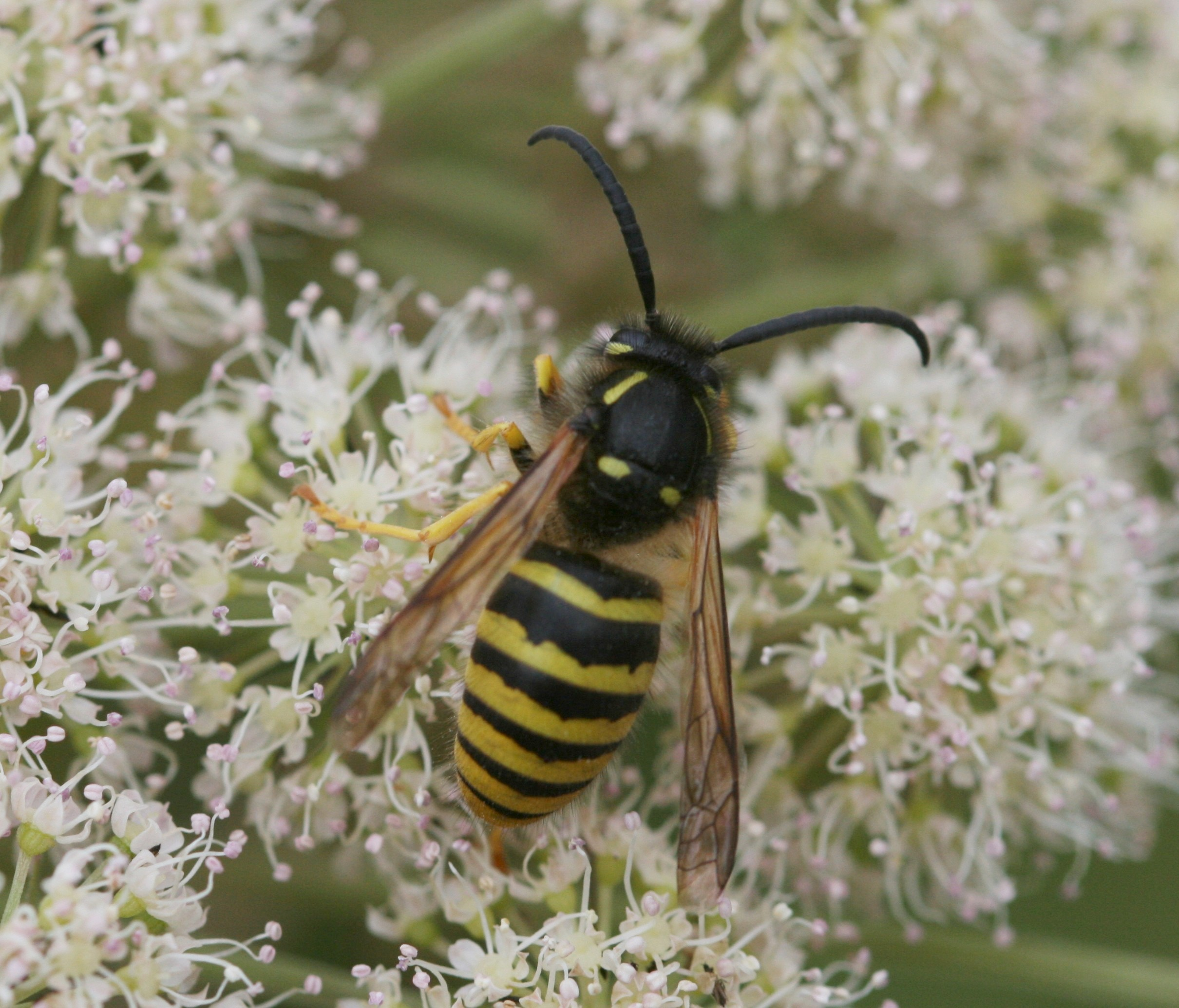
- Dolichovespula sylvestris. Dorsal view
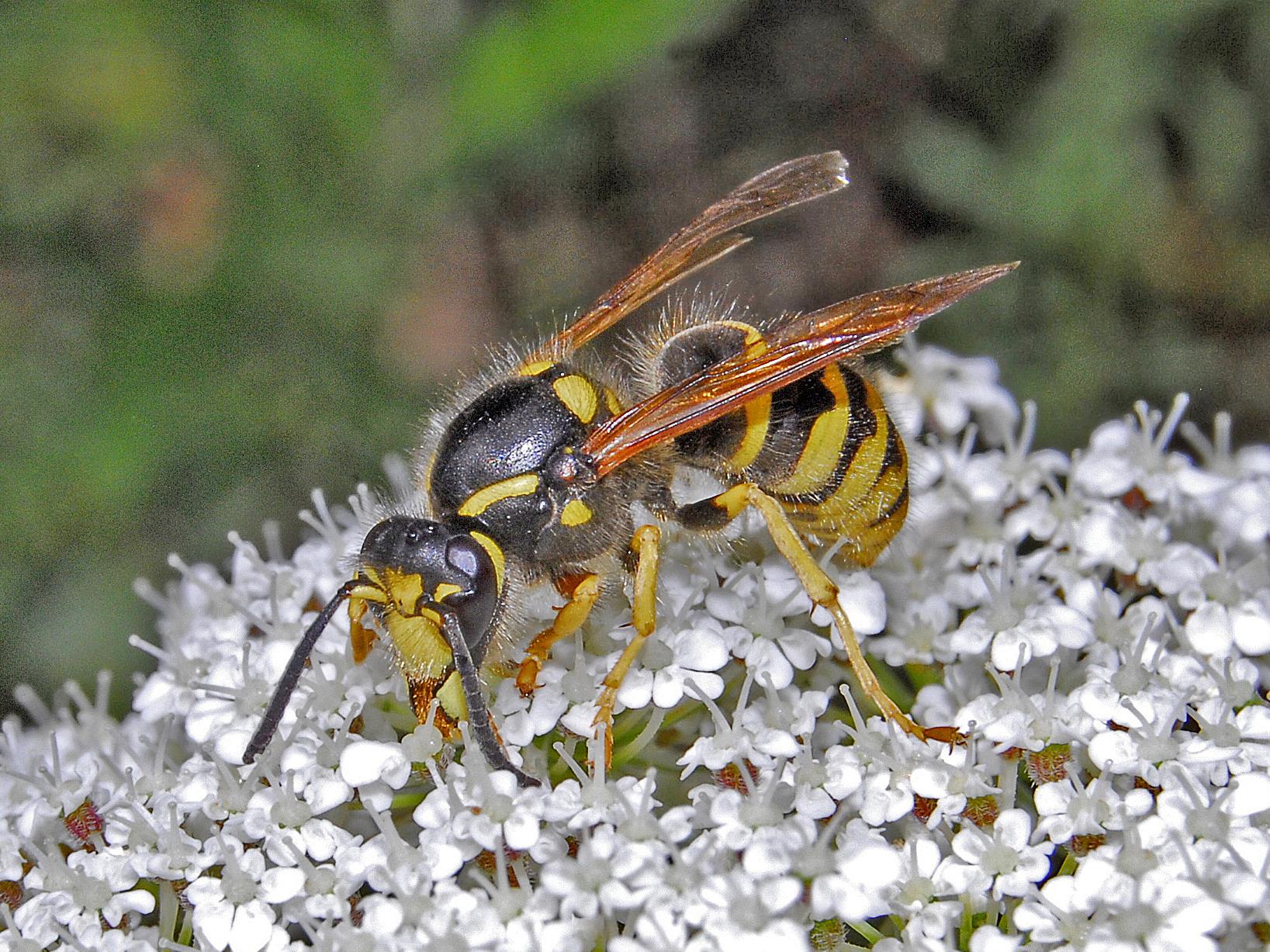
- Side view

Scientific classification
- Kingdom: Animalia
- Phylum: Arthropoda
- Clade: Pancrustacea
- Class: Insecta
- Order: Hymenoptera
- Family: Vespidae
- Genus: Dolichovespula
- Species: D. sylvestris

Binomial name
- Dolichovespula sylvestris Scopoli, 1763
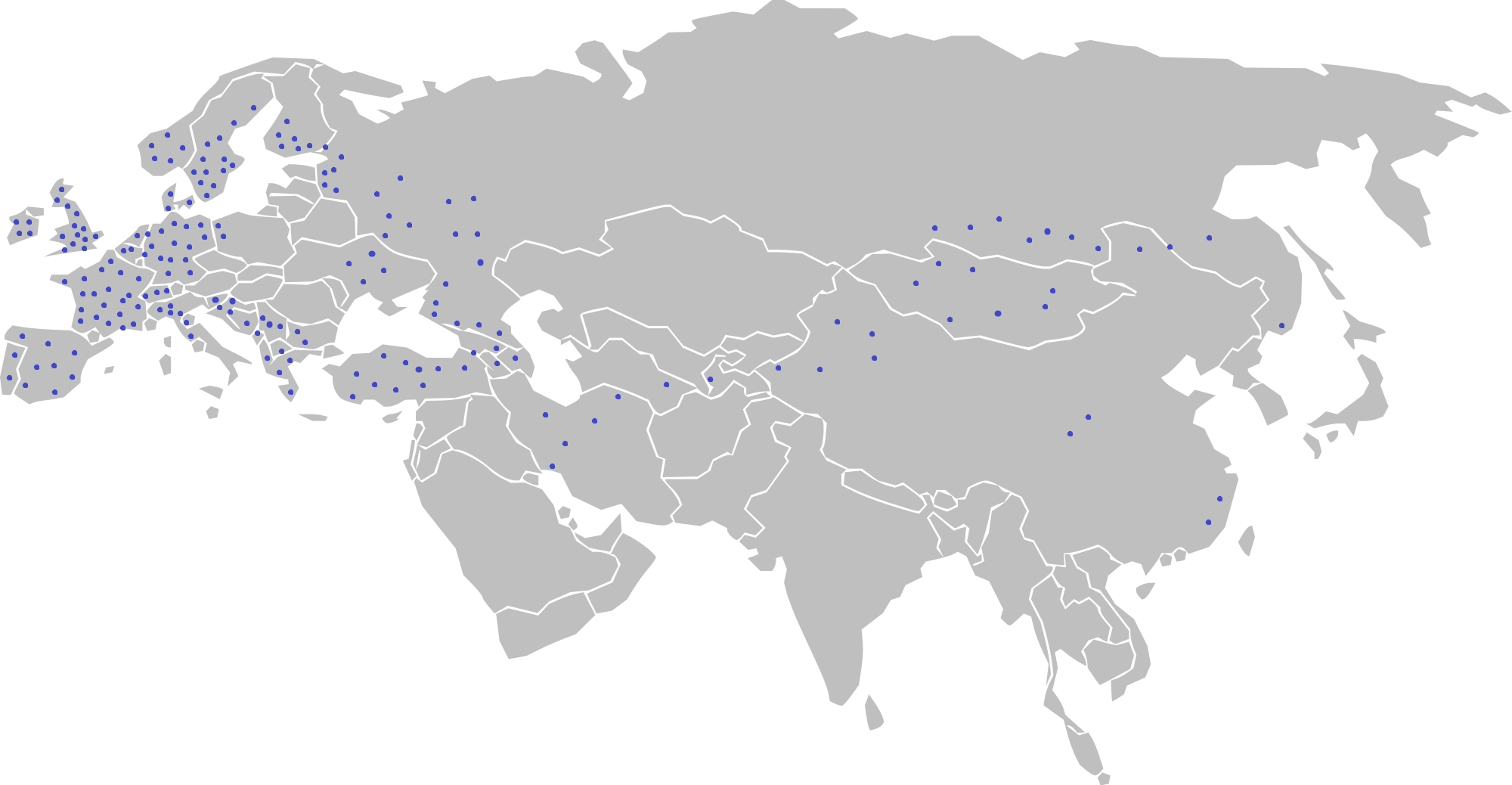
- D. sylvestris distribution

Synonyms
- List: Vespa anglica Smith, 1843; Vespa campanaria Fowler, 1833; Vespa frontalis Latreille, 1802; Vespa holsatica Fabricius, 1793; Vespa parietum Harris, 1776; Vespa pilosella Costa, 1858; Vespa sumptuosa de Buysson, 1905; Vespula xinjiangensis Lee, 1986

= Dolichovespula sylvestris =

Tree wasp

Species of wasp

The tree wasp (Dolichovespula sylvestris) is a species of eusocial wasp in the family Vespidae, found in the temperate regions of Eurasia, particularly in western Europe. Despite being called the tree wasp, it builds both aerial and underground paper nests, and can be found in rural and urban habitats. D. sylvestris is a medium-sized wasp that has yellow and black stripes and a black dot in the center of its clypeus. It is most common to see this wasp between May and September during its 3.5 month colony cycle.

Tree wasps carry out worker policing and have a haplodiploid sex-determination system; this results in a high level of relatedness within the colony. The workers will take over all of the foraging from the queen once the first workers reach adulthood. Worker wasps typically forage for other insects, the nectar of plants, and wood to digest for nest construction. The tree wasp is sometimes a victim of the nest parasite Dolichovespula omissa, who lays its eggs in the nest of D. sylvestris, as well as individual parasites including roundworms.

== Taxonomy ==
The tree wasp was first classified in 1763 by Giovanni Antonio Scopoli, a naturalist and physician who is known for classifying many species. He originally classified it as Vespa sylvestris, and later it was moved to the genus Dolichovespula. D. sylvestris is now part of the small genus of 18 species of social wasps called Dolichovespula which includes species such as the bald-faced hornet (D. maculata), Saxon wasp (D. saxonica), and Median wasp (D. media). It is part of the subfamily Vespinae which includes social wasps, social hornets, and yellow jackets.

== Distribution and habitat ==
D. sylvestris can be found throughout Western Europe and across central Asia to China, and it has also been sighted in northern Africa. It is not known to live outside of this region of the world. This species of wasp prefers temperate climates. In these regions it can be found in most habitats, including trees and shrubs, hanging from houses, and in the ground. It is often found in both urban and rural areas.

Despite being called the tree wasp, D. sylvestris builds both aerial nests in trees and hedges, as well as underground nests. These underground nests are typically built near the ground surface in preexisting holes. All nests appear to need an overhanging structure to suspend from, such as a rock, grass stem, or roof of a house, but the location and type of these structures can vary significantly.

== Description and identification ==
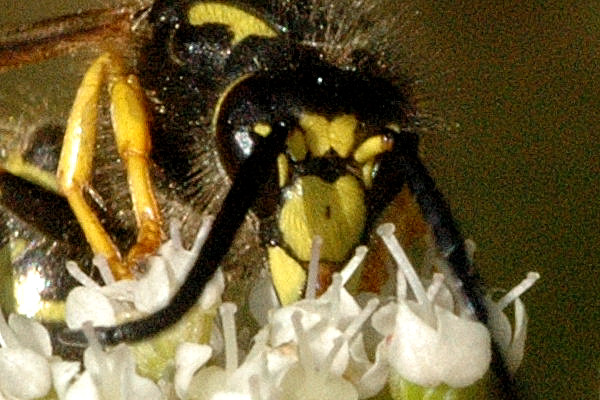
Close-up of facial markings

Dolichovespula sylvestris can reach a length of 11–15 millimetres (0.43–0.59 in) in workers, of 15–19 millimetres (0.59–0.75 in) in queens and of 13–17 millimetres (0.51–0.67 in) in males. This medium-sized species has the typical drawing of black and yellow stripes of many social wasps. The head and the thorax are predominantly black with yellow drawings. The abdomen is black with transverse yellow bands. The wings are slightly brownish. The distance between mandible and lower edge of the compound eye (oculo-malar space) is the same or longer than width of antennal scape. The large eyes are C-shaped, as they have a strong cut in the edge. At the top of the head there are three small ocelli. This species can be identified by its solid yellow face with a single small, central, black dot on the clypeus, a thorax with long lateral hairs, and two posterior yellow spots.

This species is less aggressive in comparison to many wasps, but will sting both animals and humans to protect its nest. Nests are made of paper that comes from the digestion of wood, generally dead bark, and measure 10–15 centimetres (3.9–5.9 in) in diameter with an average of 4 combs.

== Colony cycle ==
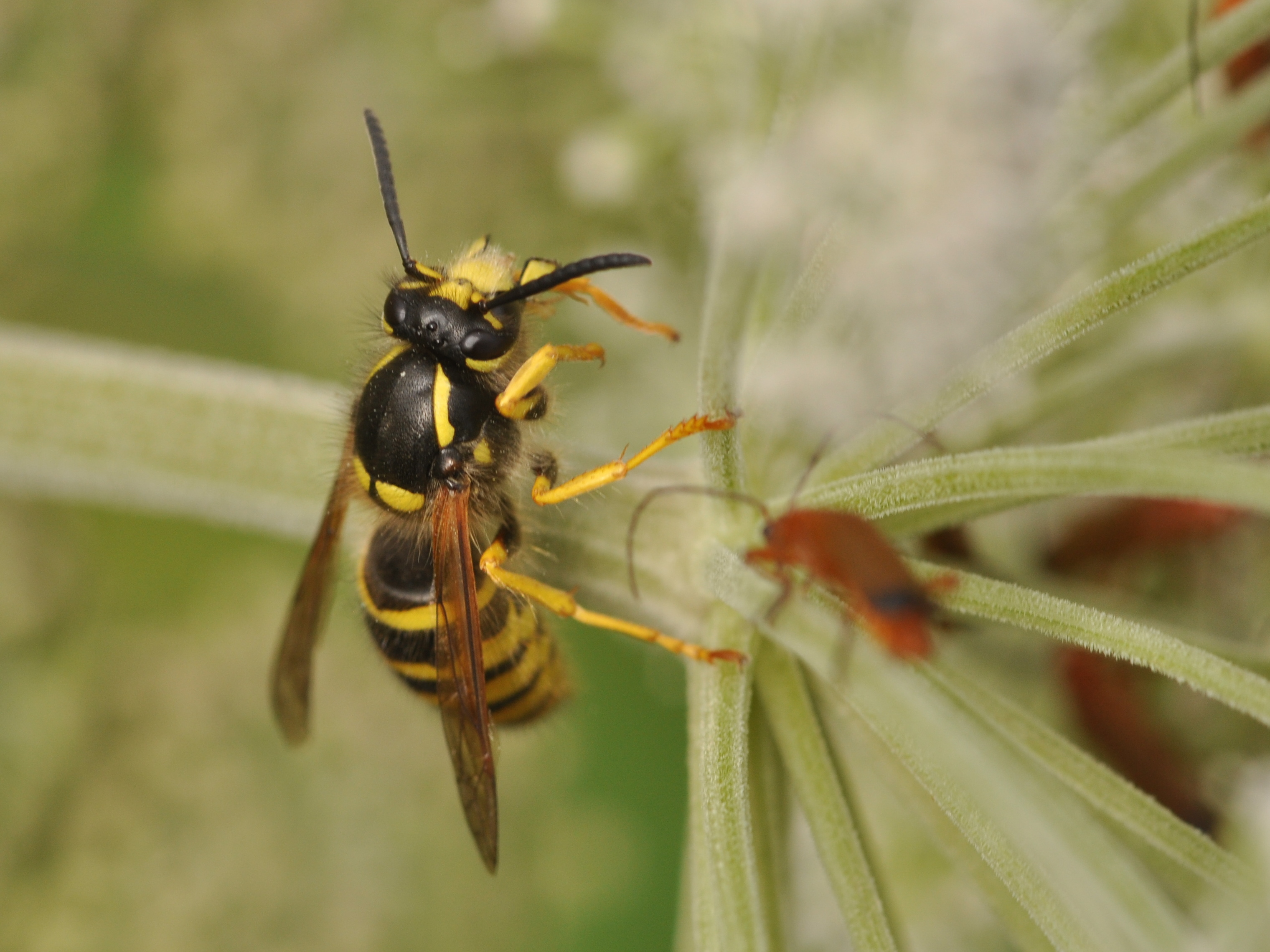
Tree wasp in Kirchwerder, Hamburg

The colony cycle for D. sylvestris is typically about 3.5 months and occurs from May through August or September. Colonies are often initiated in mid-May by a single queen who quickly begins building the nest, and laying eggs in the cells as she builds. She often completes three envelopes in a single week. These workers take about 2.5 to 3.5 weeks to develop to adults from eggs. About 40 worker eggs are produced in the nest at this stage, but some do not mature fully due to limitations in resources provided by the queen. After this stage, known as the queen colony, comes the stage where small cells are built and more workers and the first males are reared. This stage goes on for a few weeks, typically until late June. Around this time, construction of large cells that house the rearing process of queens and more males begins. These individuals emerge as adults around mid-July. The colony develops until around the end of August at which time all of the sexuals (reproducing males and queens) have left and the original queen is dead. The social structure of the nest now collapses and the workers that remain typically die soon due to starvation or old age. The queens that leave go into hibernation and begin new colonies the following May. In a single mature tree wasp colony there is an average of nearly 800 cells in the nest and a total of 400 small cell adults and 300 large cell adults.

== Foraging behaviour ==
In the colony, the queen is responsible for all of the foraging for the nest until workers mature. This includes foraging for wood to make into pulp for the nest as well as food for the larvae. Most workers begin to help with foraging the day after they emerge from the nest as adults. Almost immediately, they take over all foraging activity for the queen. The behaviour of the workers who forage differs depending on their activity. Those trying to catch flies move quickly from one flower head to the next and pounce on prey when it is found. In comparison, wasps that forage for nectar move slower and spend more time at each flower. Other workers collect pulp from dead wood to use for nest construction. It appears that if the wasp is unable to quickly catch a fly it goes on to collect nectar suggesting one worker does not always collect the same type of material. Different amounts of time are given to each activity with the most time spent gathering fluid, then pulp, and then flies. Foraging takes place from roughly sunrise to sunset of each day in order to keep up with the resources needed for the colony.

== Worker-queen conflict ==
=== Worker policing ===
Nests of eusocial Hymenoptera including D. sylvestris often have conflict between workers and the queen over production of male eggs. Male eggs can be produced by workers that do not mate because these male eggs do not need to be fertilised. Both queen and worker share more genes with their own sons than each other’s so they benefit more from producing their own eggs. In nests of tree wasps about half of the male eggs are worker produced so there is the potential for a high level of worker-queen conflict. To help decrease this conflict, eggs that are produced by workers are destroyed in a process known as worker policing. These eggs are eaten by the queen or workers shortly after being produced, but workers almost never police queen laid eggs. Worker policing is known to occur in other wasp species, particularly small colonies with high levels of worker laid eggs.

=== Aggression ===
Another way to prevent worker born larvae is that other workers or the queen may attempt to sting or push the ovipositing, egg laying, workers off of the cells. Workers almost never acted aggressively towards the queen or tried to prevent her from laying eggs. This results in nearly all eggs that mature being queen produced. Even after the original queen in a colony dies and the new queens leave, workers may lay eggs but these eggs usually starve, rarely reaching maturity.

== Genetic relatedness within colonies ==
=== Haplodiploidy ===
In the tree wasp, as in other Hymenoptera species, males are produced from unfertilised haploid eggs, while females are from fertilised diploid eggs. This is a method of sex determination known as haplodiploidy. This leads to sisters having a relatedness of 0.75 because all sperm produced are identical and they receive half of their mother’s genes while brothers have a relatedness of 0.5. However, the diploid mother is related by 0.5 to both sons and daughters. In these species, there is often conflict between the queen and workers over the sex ratio because workers are more related to sisters then either brothers or their own daughters, meaning they want to push the sex ratio so that there are more females than males. At the same time it is most beneficial for the queen to keep the ratio 1:1 because she is equally related to both. The tree wasp police the male eggs laid by workers to keep the ratio more in favor of females, but they rarely interfere with the queens eggs. It is likely that this species is only able to distinguish queen eggs from worker eggs, but is unable to distinguish male and female eggs. As such, there is too much of a risk of destroying female eggs to interfere with queen laid eggs. This helps to keep the worker-queen conflict under control.

=== Worker-worker relatedness ===
Research suggests that Dolichovespula queens including D. sylvestris queens mate only once or have most sperm fertilizing eggs come from a single mate. The characteristics in this species of the queens having one mate, only 1-2 queens producing eggs in a nest, and a high level of worker policing indicates individuals in the nest will be very closely related. One study estimated that the relatedness among workers was 0.68 with data collected from 10 nests of twenty workers and the queen from each. This value was calculated by analysis at 3 DNA microsatellite loci which allowed the researchers to determine if males were queens’ or workers’ sons. Then using a computer program, relatedness among individuals in the nest was able to be estimated. This high level of relatedness between wasps in the nest is likely what explains the eusocial behaviour in this species.

== Larval diet ==
The diet of D. sylvestris larvae was determined based on close analysis of larval pellets and observation. It was found that the wasp larvae consumed both other insects and nectar from flowers. The queen finds the insects or nectar and returns to the nest to feed them to each of the larvae during the queen nest before workers take over foraging and feeding activities. At this time, workers begin feeding the larvae, using the same types of food. Insects included many types of flies, including but not limited to march flies (Bibionidae) and crane flies (Tipulidae). The type of insects that were chosen as the main food source depended on the time of the season. These wasps prefer to feed on flies and tend to avoid ants or spiders. Queens were also observed feeding larvae nectar from flowers one drop at a time by putting her tongue and their mouths together. This nectar comes from flowers of plants such as blackberry, raspberry, and Rhododendron. Nectar seems to be a very important part of the larval diet as both queen and workers took more trips and more time collecting it than either insects or pulp for the nests. Experiments on larvae have shown that the sugar in the nectar is a necessary energy source and that without it larvae will quickly become unable to survive. Therefore, both insects and nectar are an important part of the larval diet.

== Parasites ==
=== Social parasites ===
Dolichovespula omissa is known to be a social parasite of D. sylvestris in Europe. D. omissa does not have a worker caste and instead the queens of this parasitic species have the workers of the host species raise their young. This is beneficial to D. omissa because they do not have to use resources to raise their young. In contrast, this is very bad for the tree wasp whose workers are now using their resources to raise offspring that are not related to them at all. Few details are known about the social parasite D. omissa or its effect on the nests of D. sylvestris.

=== Individual parasites ===
D. sylvestris is also affected by parasites that influence the individual. These include both fungi and roundworms. In particular, the fungus Paecilomyces farinosus and the mermithid roundworm, Pheromermis pachysoma are known to parasitise the tree wasp. P. farinosus most often infects wasps and nests after death and therefore does not majorly influence the health of the colony. P. pachysoma typically infects flies and other insects when the roundworm eggs are eaten. The parasites then hatch in the insects and infects the wasp when the infected insects are fed to the wasp larvae. These roundworms usually do not kill the infected wasp but grow in their abdomen and can cause sexuals to become sterile. This has a negative impact on the individual as they are not able to reproduce and pass their genes on to the next generation. However, this is not likely to have a major impact on the colony since most worker eggs are policed and the queens typically only have a single mate.

== Human importance ==
D. sylvestris is generally not considered a pest despite the fact that it is widespread in many regions and lives in urban areas nesting in areas such as the ground, in hedges, or hanging from eaves of houses. This is mostly due to the fact that this species of wasp does not like to enter buildings and is not interested in the types of food that are consumed by humans. It normally is not a problem around humans unless it builds a nest where people do not want it or where there is risk of children encountering the nest. The tree wasp is not very aggressive compared to other species of wasps, but can sting if it feels its nest is threatened. On the other hand, many of the reported pest problems for wasps in Scotland have been found to be D. sylvestris suggesting that many people do consider it a pest. Whether this was just from the presence of the nest or aggression of the wasps is unknown.
