= Evolutionary Theory (journal) =

- Discipline: Evolutionary biology
- Language: English
- Edited by: Leigh Van Valen, Melissa Stoller

Publication details
- History: 1973-2003
- Publisher: University of Chicago (United States)

Standard abbreviations
- ISO 4: Evol. Theory

Indexing
- ISSN: 0093-4755
- LCCN: 77641946
- OCLC no.: 183404656

Evolutionary theory was a peer-reviewed scientific journal covering all aspects of evolutionary biology. It was established in 1973 and published until 2003 by the University of Chicago. The founding editor-in-chief was Leigh Van Valen, later joined by Melissa Stoller.

== History ==
Evolutionary Theory was founded in 1973 after Leigh Van Valen's paper titled "A New Evolutionary Law" that would later go on to become one of the most influential papers in evolutionary biology was rejected by numerous other journals, including Nature. That same paper would become the first paper ever published in Evolutionary Theory.
