= Red Queen hypothesis =

Concept in evolutionary biology

The Red Queen hypothesis is a hypothesis in evolutionary biology proposed in 1973, that species must constantly adapt, evolve, and proliferate in order to survive while pitted against ever-evolving opposing species. The hypothesis was intended to explain the constant (age-independent) extinction probability as observed in the paleontological record caused by co-evolution between competing species; however, it has also been suggested that the Red Queen hypothesis explains the advantage of sexual reproduction (as opposed to asexual reproduction) at the level of individuals, and the positive correlation between speciation and extinction rates in most higher taxa.

== Origin ==
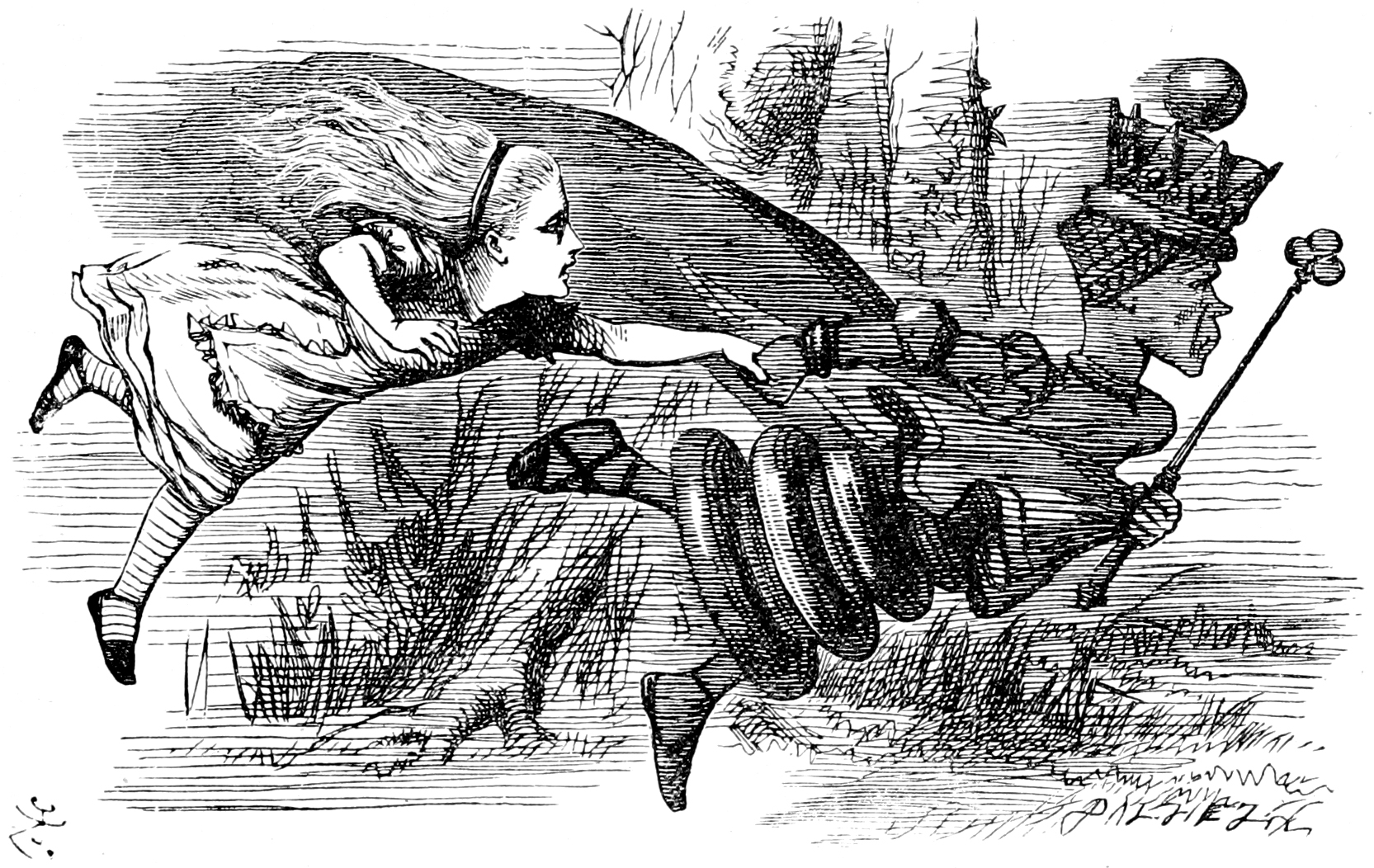
"Now, here, you see, it takes all the running you can do, to keep in the same place." — Lewis Carroll

In 1973, Leigh Van Valen proposed the hypothesis as an "explanatory tangent" to explain the "law of extinction" known as "Van Valen's law", which states that the probability of extinction does not depend on the lifetime of the species or higher-rank taxon, instead being constant over millions of years for any given taxon. However, the probability of extinction is strongly related to adaptive zones, because different taxa have different probabilities of extinction. In other words, extinction of a species occurs randomly with respect to age, but nonrandomly with respect to ecology. Collectively, these two observations suggest that the effective environment of any homogeneous group of organisms deteriorates at a stochastically constant rate. Van Valen proposed that this is the result of an evolutionary zero-sum game driven by interspecific competition: the evolutionary progress (= increase in fitness) of one species deteriorates the fitness of coexisting species, but because coexisting species evolve as well, no one species gains a long-term increase in fitness, and the overall fitness of the system remains constant.

Van Valen named the hypothesis "Red Queen" because under his hypothesis, species have to "run" or evolve in order to stay in the same place, or else go extinct. As the Red Queen said to Alice in Lewis Carroll's Through the Looking-Glass in her explanation of the nature of Looking-Glass Land:

Now, here, you see, it takes all the running you can do, to keep in the same place.

== Examples ==
=== Positive correlation between speciation and extinction rates (Stanley's rule) ===
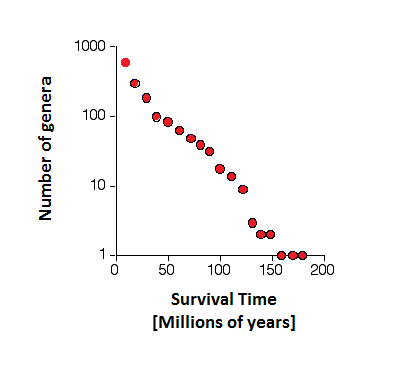
The "law of extinction": The linear relationship between survival times and the logarithm of the number of genera suggests that the probability of extinction is constant over time. Redrawn from Leigh Van Valen (1973).

Palaeontological data suggest that high speciation rates correlate with high extinction rates in almost all major taxa. This correlation has been attributed to a number of ecological factors, but it may result also from a Red Queen situation, in which each speciation event in a clade deteriorates the fitness of coexisting species in the same clade (provided that there is phylogenetic niche conservatism).

=== Evolution of sex ===
Discussions of the evolution of sex were not part of Van Valen's Red Queen hypothesis, which addressed evolution at scales above the species level. The microevolutionary version of the Red Queen hypothesis was proposed by Bell, also citing Lewis Carroll.

The Red Queen hypothesis is used independently by multiple researchers to explain the evolution of sex, the maintenance of sex, and the role of sex in response to parasites. In all cases, sexual reproduction confers species variability and a faster generational response to selection by making offspring genetically unique.

Sexual species are able to improve their genotype in changing conditions. Consequently, co-evolutionary interactions, between host and parasite, for example, may select for sexual reproduction in hosts in order to reduce the risk of infection. Oscillations in genotype frequencies are observed between parasites and hosts in an antagonistic coevolutionary way without necessitating changes to the phenotype. In multi-host and multi-parasite coevolution, the Red Queen dynamics could affect what host and parasite types will become dominant or rare.

Science writer Matt Ridley popularized the term "Red Queen" in connection with sexual selection in his 1993 book The Red Queen, in which he discussed the debate in theoretical biology over the adaptive benefit of sexual reproduction to those species in which it appears. The connection of the Red Queen to this debate arises from the fact that the traditionally accepted Vicar of Bray hypothesis only showed adaptive benefit at the level of the species or group, not at the level of the gene (although the protean "Vicar of Bray" adaptation is very useful to some species that belong to the lower levels of the food chain). By contrast, a Red-Queen-type thesis suggesting that organisms are running cyclic arms races with their parasites can explain the utility of sexual reproduction at the level of the gene by positing that the role of sex is to preserve genes that are currently disadvantageous, but that will become advantageous against the background of a likely future population of parasites.

However, the assumption of the Red Queen hypothesis, that the primary factor in maintaining sexual reproduction is the generation of genetic variation does not appear to be generally applicable. Analysis of the ancestry of strains of the yeasts Saccharomyces cerevisiae and Saccharomyces paradoxus under natural conditions concluded that outcrossing occurs only about once every 50,000 cell divisions. This low frequency of outcrossing implies that there is little opportunity for the production of recombinational variation. In nature, mating is likely most often between closely related yeast cells. Mating occurs when haploid cells of opposite mating type MATa and MATα come into contact, and such contacts are frequent between closely related yeast cells for two reasons:

- Cells of opposite mating type are present together in the same ascus, the sac that contains the cells directly produced by a single meiosis, and these cells can mate with each other.
- Haploid cells of one mating type, upon cell division, often produce cells of the opposite mating type with which they can mate.

The relative rarity in nature of meiotic events that result from outcrossing is inconsistent with the idea that production of genetic variation is the main selective force maintaining meiosis in this organism (as would be expected by the Red Queen hypothesis). However, these findings in yeast are consistent with the alternative idea that the main selective force maintaining meiosis is enhanced recombinational repair of DNA damage, since this benefit is realized during each meiosis, whether or not out-crossing occurs.

Further evidence of the Red Queen hypothesis was observed in allelic effects under sexual selection. The Red Queen hypothesis leads to the understanding that allelic recombination is advantageous for populations that engage in aggressive biotic interactions, such as predator–prey or parasite–host interactions. In cases of parasite-host relations, sexual reproduction can quicken the production of new multi-locus genotypes allowing the host to escape parasites that have adapted to the prior generations of typical hosts. Mutational effects can be represented by models to describe how recombination through sexual reproduction can be advantageous. According to the mutational deterministic hypothesis, if the deleterious mutation rate is high, and if those mutations interact to cause a general decline in organismal fitness, then sexual reproduction provides an advantage over asexually reproducing organisms by allowing populations to eliminate the deleterious mutations not only more rapidly, but also most effectively. Recombination is one of the fundamental means that explain why many organisms have evolved to reproduce sexually.

Sexual organisms must spend resources to find mates. In the case of sexual dimorphism, usually one of the sexes contributes more to the survival of their offspring (usually the mother). In such cases, the only adaptive benefit of having a second sex is the possibility of sexual selection, by which organisms can improve their genotype.

Evidence for this explanation for the evolution of sex is provided by the comparison of the rate of molecular evolution of genes for kinases and immunoglobulins in the immune system with genes coding other proteins. The genes coding for immune system proteins evolve considerably faster.

Further evidence for the Red Queen hypothesis was provided by observing long-term dynamics and parasite coevolution in a mixed sexual and asexual population of snails (Potamopyrgus antipodarum). The number of sexuals, the number of asexuals, and the rates of parasitic infection for both were monitored. It was found that clones that were plentiful at the beginning of the study became more susceptible to parasites over time. As parasite infections increased, the once-plentiful clones dwindled dramatically in number. Some clonal types disappeared entirely. Meanwhile, sexual snail populations remained much more stable over time.

On the other hand, a study of mite infestations of a parthenogenetic gecko species and its two related sexual ancestral species found that, contrary to expectation based on the Red Queen hypothesis, the prevalence, abundance and mean intensity of mites in sexual geckos was significantly higher than in asexuals sharing the same habitat. Critics of the Red Queen hypothesis question whether the constantly changing environment of hosts and parasites is sufficiently common to explain the evolution of sexual reproduction. In particular, one study found that species interactions (e.g. host vs parasite interactions) usually select against sexual reproduction, and that even though the Red Queen hypothesis favors sex under certain circumstances, it alone does not account for the ubiquity of sex. A review of numerous genetic studies on plant disease resistance failed to uncover a single example consistent with the assumptions of the Red Queen hypothesis.

In 2011, researchers used the microscopic roundworm Caenorhabditis elegans as a host and the pathogenic bacterium Serratia marcescens to generate a host–parasite coevolutionary system in a controlled environment, allowing them to conduct more than 70 evolution experiments testing the Red Queen hypothesis. They genetically manipulated the mating system of C. elegans, causing populations to mate either sexually, by self-fertilization, or a mixture of both within the same population. Then they exposed those populations to the S. marcescens parasite. It was found that the self-fertilizing populations of C. elegans were rapidly driven extinct by the coevolving parasites, while sex allowed populations to keep pace with their parasites, a result consistent with the Red Queen hypothesis. However, a study of the frequency of outcrossing in natural populations showed that self-fertilization is the predominant mode of reproduction in C. elegans, with infrequent outcrossing events occurring at a rate of around 1%.

Although meioses that result in selfing are unlikely to contribute significantly to beneficial genetic variability, these meioses may provide the adaptive benefit of recombinational repair of DNA damages that arise, especially under stressful conditions.

=== Evolution of aging ===
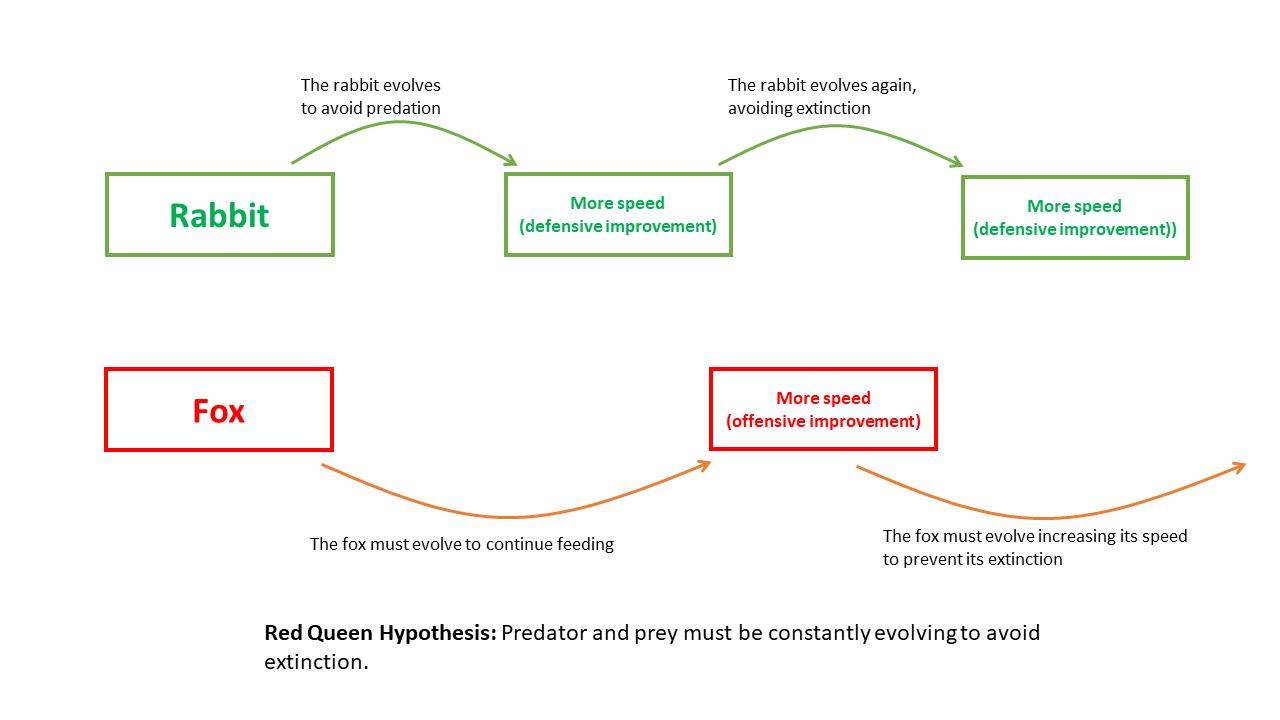
Predator-prey relationship between rabbits and foxes following the principle of the Red Queen hypothesis. The rabbit evolves increasing speed to escape the attack of the fox, and the fox evolves increasing speed to reach the rabbit. This evolution is constant; were one of the two to stop evolving, it would go extinct.

The Red Queen hypothesis has been invoked by some authors to explain evolution of aging. The main idea is that aging is favored by natural selection since it allows faster adaptation to changing conditions, especially in order to keep pace with the evolution of pathogens, predators and prey.

=== Interspecies race ===
A number of predator/prey species couple compete via running speed. "The rabbit runs faster than the fox, because the rabbit is running for his life while the fox is only running for his dinner." Aesop The predator-prey relationship can also be established in the microbial world, producing the same evolutionary phenomenon that occurs in the case of foxes and rabbits. A recently observed example has as protagonists M. xanthus (predator) and E. coli (prey) in which a parallel evolution of both species can be observed through genomic and phenotypic modifications, producing in future generations a better adaptation of one of the species that is counteracted by the evolution of the other, thus generating an arms race that can only be stopped by the extinction of one of the species.

The interactions between parasitoid wasps and insect larvae, necessary for the parasitic wasp's life cycle, are also a good illustration of a race. Evolutionary strategy was found by both partners to respond to the pressure generated by the mutual association of lineages. For example, the parasitoid wasp group, Campoletis sonorensis, is able to fight against the immune system of its hosts, Heliothis virescens (Lepidopteran) with the association of a polydnavirus (PDV) (Campoletis sonorensis PDV). During the oviposition process, the parasitoid transmits the virus (CsPDV) to the insect larva. The CsPDV will alter the physiology, growth and development of the infected insect larvae to the benefit of the parasitoid.

== Competing evolutionary ideas ==
A competing evolutionary idea is the court jester hypothesis, which indicates that an arms race is not the driving force of evolution on a large scale, but rather it is abiotic factors.

The Black Queen hypothesis is a theory of reductive evolution that suggests natural selection can drive organisms to reduce their genome size. In other words, a gene that confers a vital biological function can become dispensable for an individual organism if its community members express that gene in a "leaky" fashion. Like the Red Queen hypothesis, the Black Queen hypothesis is a theory of co-evolution.

== Publication ==
Van Valen originally submitted his article to the Journal of Theoretical Biology, where it was accepted for publication. However, because "the manner of processing depended on payment of page charges", Van Valen withdrew his manuscript and founded a new Journal called Evolutionary Theory, in which he published his manuscript as the first paper. Van Valen's acknowledgement to the National Science Foundation ran: "I thank the National Science Foundation for regularly rejecting my (honest) grant applications for work on real organisms, thus forcing me into theoretical work".

== See also ==
- Chaos theory
- Interspecific competition
- Macroevolution
- Punctuated equilibrium
- Red King hypothesis
- Survivorship curve
