= Leigh Van Valen =

American biologist

- Van Valen in 1981
- Born: August 12, 1935; Albany, New York
- Died: October 16, 2010 (aged 75); Chicago, Illinois
- Occupation: Evolutionary biologist
- Known for: Red Queen hypothesis

Leigh Van Valen (August 12, 1935 – October 16, 2010) was an American evolutionary biologist. At the time of his death, he was professor emeritus in the Department of Ecology and Evolution at the University of Chicago.

== Research and interests ==
Amongst other work, Van Valen's proposed "Law of Extinction", known as Van Valen's law, drew upon the apparent constant probability (as opposed to rate) of extinction in families of related organisms, based on data compiled from existing literature on the duration of tens of thousands of genera throughout the fossil record. Van Valen proposed the Red Queen hypothesis (1973), as an explanatory tangent to the Law of Extinction. The Red Queen hypothesis captures the idea that there is a constant 'arms race' between co-evolving species. Its name is a reference to the Red Queen's race in Lewis Carroll's Through the Looking-Glass, in which the chess board moves such that Alice must continue running just to stay in the same place.

Van Valen also defined the Ecological Species Concept in 1976, in contrast to Ernst Mayr's Biological Species Concept. In 1991, he proposed that HeLa cells be defined as a new species, which was named Helacyton gartleri.

Van Valen originated the concept of fuzzy sets, prior to the formalization of this concept by L.A. Zadeh. He was the founding editor of the journal Evolutionary Theory, which he printed on simple paper stock under the motto, "Substance over form."

He was also interested in fields outside biology, including measure theory, probability theory, logic, thermodynamics, epistemology and the philosophy of science. As a biologist, Van Valen considered the role of zoological and botanical gardens, in a world with a degrading natural environment, to be essential for the safeguard of endangered flora and fauna.

== Biography ==
Van Valen was born on Aug. 12, 1935, in Albany, NY and was chosen "most academic" in the first grade. He earned a zoology and botany degree at age 20 in 1955 from Miami University in Ohio. As a graduate student at Columbia University, he studied under George Gaylord Simpson and Theodosius Dobzhansky, both giants in honing the synthetic theory of evolution, which melded Darwin's ideas about evolution with Mendel's on genetics. Van Valen met and married Phebe May Hoff while they were both doctoral students in biology at Columbia. They had two children, girls Katrina and Diana, but divorced in 1984. Van Valen then married Virginia Maiorana, eventually separating from that relationship as well. At the time of his passing, he was engaged to Towako Katsuno, a Japanese professor of Geriatric Nursing, whom he met when she came to Chicago to do her PhD.

Van Valen died on October 16, 2010, of pneumonia at St. Mary of Nazareth Hospital Center in Chicago, Illinois. Van Valen had been hospitalized for more than three months from a rare form of fungal pneumonia, complicated by a long-standing but slowly progressing form of leukemia.

== Van Valen's description of his work ==
On the University of Chicago website for the Committee on Conceptual and Historical Studies of Science, Van Valen had written and posted this about himself:

I am a generalist and tend to open new approaches more than fill them in. What I work on changes irregularly and unpredictably with the progress of theory and knowledge. I am currently writing a book that expands on my perspective (the Red Queen's hypothesis) of trophic energy as a major controller of evolution and ecology. Some recent topics: (1) The evolution of biotas can be approached through changes in patterns of energy flow and their control. I am looking at the basal Cenozoic radiation of placental mammals from this perspective; there are surprisingly large changes in the group selection causing the changes, and in its components; (2) Single-species populations of birds decrease in density with body size at the same rate as the total energy flow through single individuals increases. A student found a similar pattern for mammals. This implies a community regulation of absolute fitnesses, if one accepts my heretical (ecological) view of the nature of fitness; (3)The actual levels of selection in the current rapid evolution of our own species differ from standard concepts and are generalizable; (4) Charles Lyell used (real) species selection before Darwin. Work of my students has also been diverse. Some examples: norm of reaction, biogeography, fossil mammals, mathematical anthropological genetics, complexity, body size, human sociobiology, developmental noise, sloth limbs, natural selection, allometry. My interests go beyond what the blurb indicates.

== Publications ==
Van Valen's publications include:

- "Ecological species, multispecies, and oaks" (1976), Taxon, 25:233–239.
- "HeLa, a new microbial species". With Virginia C. Maiorana (1991). Evolutionary Theory, 10:71–74.
- "The extinction of the multituberculates", Systematic Zoology 15 (1966), 261–278 (with R.E. Sloan).
- "Selection in natural populations 7, New York babies (Fetal Life Study)", Annals of Human Genetics 31 (1967), 109–121 (with G.W. Mellen).
- "The origins of inversion polymorphisms", American Naturalist 102 (1968), 5–24 (with R. Levins).
- "A new evolutionary law", Evolutionary Theory 1 (1973), 1–30.
- "Brain size and intelligence in man", American Journal of Physical Anthropology 40 (1974), 417–423.
- "Multivariate structural statistics in natural history", Journal of Theoretical Biology 45 (1974), 235–247.
- "Group selection, sex, and fossils", Evolution 29 (1975), 87–94.
- "Individualistic classes", Philosophy of Science 43 (1977), 539–541.
- "The Archaebacteria and eukaryotic origins", Nature 287 (1980), 248–250 (with V.C. Maiorana).
- "Why misunderstand the evolutionary half of biology?" in E. Saarinen, ed., Conceptual Issues in Ecology, Reidel, 1982, 323–343.
- "Homology and causes", Journal of Morphology 173 (1982), 305–312.
- "Species, sets, and the derivative nature of philosophy", Biology and Philosophy 3 (1988), 49–66.
- "Biotal evolution: a manifesto", Evolutionary Theory 10 (1991), 1–13.
- "The origin of the plesiadapid primates and the nature of Purgatorius", Evolutionary Monographs 15 (1994), 1–79.
- "The last third of Mendel's paper", Evolutionary Theory 12 (2001), 99–100.
- "The evolution of menopause", Evolutionary Theory 12 (2003), 131–153.
- "The statistics of variation", in: Variation (B. Hallgrímsson & B. Hall, ed.), Elsevier Academic Press (2005), 29–47.
- "How ubiquitous is adaptation? A critique of the epiphenomenist program", Biology and Philosophy 24 (2009), 267–280.
