= Stress gradient hypothesis =

Hypothesis in ecology

The stress gradient hypothesis (SGH) is an evolutionary theory in microbial ecology and community ecology that provides a framework to predict when positive or negative interactions should be observed in an habitat. The SGH states that facilitation, cooperation or mutualism should be more common in stressful environments, compared with benign environments (i.e nutrient excess) where competition or parasitism should be more common.

The stress gradient hypothesis, in which ecological interactions shift in a positive direction with increasing environmental stress, is controversial among ecologists, in part because of contradictory support. A 2021 meta analysis study compared SGH across different organisms with intraspecific and interspecific interactions and conclude that the SGH is indeed a broadly relevant ecological phenomena that is currently held back by cross-disciplinary communication barriers.

SGH is well supported by studies that feature bacteria, plants, terrestrial ecosystems, interspecific negative interactions, adults, survival instead of growth or reproduction, and drought, fire, and nutrient stress.

Drought and nutrient stress, especially when combined, shift ecological interactions positively.
