= Black Queen hypothesis =

Theory connecting gene loss in microbial communities to natural selection

The Black Queen hypothesis (BQH) is a reductive evolution theory which seeks to explain how natural selection (as opposed to genetic drift) can drive gene loss. In a microbial community, different members may have genes which produce certain chemicals or resources in a "leaky fashion" making them accessible to other members of that community. If this resource is available to certain members of a community in a way that allows them to sufficiently access that resource without generating it themselves, these other members in the community may lose the biological function (or the gene) involved in producing that chemical. Put another way, the black queen hypothesis is concerned with the conditions under which it is advantageous to lose certain biological functions. By accessing resources without the need to generate it themselves, these microbes conserve energy and streamline their genomes to enable faster replication.

Jeffrey Morris proposed the Black Queen hypothesis in his 2011 PhD dissertation. In the following year, Morris wrote another publication on the subject alongside Richard Lenski and Erik Zinser more fully refining and fleshing out the hypothesis. The name of the hypothesis—"Black Queen hypothesis"—is a play on the Red Queen hypothesis, an earlier theory of coevolution which states that organisms must constantly refine and adapt to keep up with the changing environment and the evolution of other organisms.

== Principles ==
=== Original theory ===
The "Black Queen" refers to the "Queen of Spades" from the card game Hearts. The goal of Hearts is to end up as the player with the fewest number of points. However, the Queen of Spades is worth the same number of points as all the other cards combined. For this reason, players seek to avoid getting the Queen of Spades. At the same time, one player must end up with the Queen. Similarly, the BQH posits that members of a community will dispense with any functions (or genes) that become dispensable. At the same time, at least one or a few members of the community must retain that function so that the other members can outsource it (since it remains critical for the survival of each member). This process leads to commensalistic or mutualistic interactions between members of a microbial community. Compared to the Red Queen hypothesis, it is fairly recent; thus, it has not been thoroughly tested and the mechanisms driving it have not been fully elucidated.

In Hearts, "Shooting the Moon" is a risky strategy where one player seeks to get the Queen of Spades in addition to all cards of the Heart suit. If the player is successful in gaining every card that is otherwise individually negative to gain, they will end up accruing no points. Analogously, in BQH, shooting the moon refers to the strategy in which a helper for one function is more likely to become a helper for another unrelated function. These helper organism retain all genes encoding leaky functions. While the large corresponding genome might appear maladaptive, it may allow for survival as the other members of the microbial community now depend on the helper organisms survival, and in the case of a population bottleneck, the helper organism will retain the genes necessary to survive independently.

=== Later elaborations ===
A "strong version" of the BQH has been proposed, which suggests that there are no "keystone" members of a microbial community which take on all leaky functions. Rather, all members of the community will come to depend on others to some extent. In this case, no single species in the community is capable of surviving on its own and a migration will require the movement of members from several species to be successful. It may be possible for some microbes to avoid this "public goods" dilemma by forming a biofilm, where cells multiply and aggregate closely such that the whole community is made up of individuals with a closely related genotype and so all possess the same functional genes and capacities.

More recently, a "Gray Queen Hypothesis" has been posited which seeks to explain the same phenomena in a related way, but through the lenses of constructive neutral evolution. Constructive neutral evolution seeks to explain how complex systems can emerge through neutral transitions. This might involve the chance emergence of not-yet-necessary interactions (e.g. one protein gaining the capacity to bind to another it was previously unable to bind to) that enables an otherwise deleterious mutation to arise in the population but without a negative effect on the organism. But now, the organism is dependent on that interaction that emerged by chance. A new interaction has emerged in the system, and individuals who lose that interaction will be eliminated through purifying selection. The system overall has complexified, although the outcome is the same. The rise of interdependent microbial communities has been posited to be explainable through this mechanism. Initially, the loss of a gene dedicated to producing an important resource for the cell would be deleterious. However, a community of microbes might have an excess of that resource. For this reason, the presence of these interspecies microbial interactions enables an otherwise deleterious mutation (loss of a gene needed for generating an important resource) to be acquired but without a deleterious effect on the individual. Genetic drift then results in this trait (or the loss thereof) to spread into the population, and the population of the species in the community is now dependent on its community for survival. While the individual species has simplified, the complexity of the microbial community overall has risen due to the requirement for additional and symbiotic interactions to propagate the community as a whole.

== Application ==
The BQH was proposed to explain the evolution of dependencies within free-living microbial communities, but was later extended to explain nitrogen fixation, nutrient acquisition and biofilm production in microbes. More generally, it has also been used to explain gene loss via genome streamlining, cooperative interactions and evolution of communities. Studies have also shown that local interactions within bacterial communities can promote the right amount of trade-off between resource production and resource limitation to stimulate mutual dependencies as proposed by BQH. This type of Black Queen dynamism has also been described in microbial and microbialite mats from Cuatro Ciénegas Coahuila where the particular physicochemical properties of the site have caused the microbial communities to remain practically isolated for millions of years. It has been observed that the bacteria of the genus Bacilus have substantially reduced their genomes, as well as they have shown an interdependence between the bacteria of that site, which has led to the suggestion of the existence of a pangenome or holobionts.

== Quorum sensing and partial privatization of goods ==
Quorum sensing is a regulatory process that plays a role in the management of partially privatized or mixed goods, as outlined in various studies. However, there's a scarcity of evidence to support the idea that partial privatization alone can promote the evolution of quorum sensing.

A population genetics model focused on unstructured microbial populations has provided some insights. The findings indicate that if autoinducers carry a cost, partial privatization will not give an evolutionary advantage to quorum sensing. The reasoning behind this conclusion is twofold:

1. When autoinducers are costly, any microbial strain that simultaneously produces both the autoinducer and mixed goods is unlikely to maintain its presence within the population.
2. Under the condition of costly autoinducers, partial privatization does not promote the metabolic specialization of quorum sensing. This is because strains that only produce autoinducers and strains that produce mixed goods in response to the autoinducers cannot coexist without being vulnerable to invasion by cheater strains.

From this model, it can be inferred that partial privatization might have been essential in supporting an early form of quorum sensing, where autoinducers were considered metabolic byproducts and thus had no associated costs. However, it seems to be inadequate for fostering the evolution to a state where autoinducers come with a cost.

== See also ==
- Red Queen Hypothesis
- Reductive evolution
- Genetic drift
- Punctuated equilibrium
