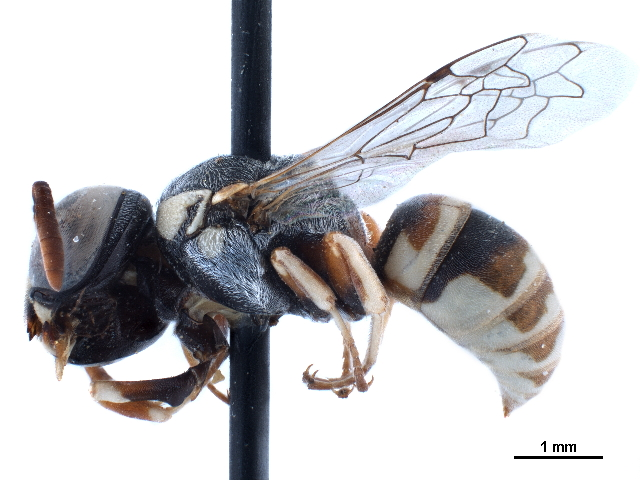
- Euparagia desertorum

Scientific classification
- Domain: Eukaryota
- Kingdom: Animalia
- Phylum: Arthropoda
- Class: Insecta
- Order: Hymenoptera
- Family: Vespidae
- Subfamily: Euparagiinae; Ashmead 1902

Genera
- See text

= Euparagiinae =

Euparagiinae Temporal range: Early Cretaceous–Recent

Subfamily of wasps

The Euparagiinae are a small subfamily of rare wasps in the family Vespidae containing a single extant genus Euparagia. The group had a cosmopolitan distribution in past geological times extending back to the Early Cretaceous, but is now a geographically relict taxon known only from the desert regions of the Southwestern United States and northwestern Mexico.

This subfamily, with this same rank, has been previously grouped with the pollen wasps and treated together as the family "Masaridae". Now, the Euparagiinae are considered an independent subfamily and the sister group of the remainder of the Vespidae. Their wing venation is unique and differs from all other Vespidae; they also characteristically have a single small pale spot at the posterior edge of the mesonotum, and the femora and trochanters of the male front legs are modified in species-specific shapes.

The biology of only one species (Euparagia scutellaris) is known, and the females provision nests in the soil with weevil larvae.

== Taxonomy ==
- Euparagia Cresson, 1879
  - Euparagia boregoensis Bohart, 1948
  - Euparagia desertorum Bohart, 1948
  - Euparagia maculiceps (Cameron, 1904)
  - Euparagia platiniceps Bohart, 1938
  - Euparagia richardsi Bohart & Krombein 1979
  - Euparagia scutellaris Cresson, 1879
  - Euparagia siccata Bohart, 1988
  - Euparagia timberlakei Bohart, 1948
  - Euparagia unidentata Carpenter & Kimsey, 2009
  - Euparagia yuma Bohart, 1988
- †Curiosivespa Rasnitsyn, 1975
  - † Curiosivespa antiqua Carpenter & Rasnitsyn, 1990 Zaza Formation, Russia, Early Cretaceous (Aptian)
  - † Curiosivespa curiosa Rasnitsyn, 1975 Kzyl-Zhar, Kazakhstan, Late Cretaceous (Turonian)
  - † Curiosivespa derivata Carpenter & Rasnitsyn, 1990 Dzun-Bain Formation, Mongolia, Early Cretaceous (Aptian)
  - † Curiosivespa magna Rasnitsyn, 1975 Kzyl-Zhar, Kazakhstan, Late Cretaceous (Turonian)
  - † Curiosivespa orapa Brothers, 1992 Orapa, Botswana, Late Cretaceous (Turonian)
  - † Curiosivespa striata Perrard & Carpenter, 2017 Burmese amber, Myanmar, Late Cretaceous (Cenomanian)
  - † Curiosivespa zigrasi Perrard & Carpenter, 2017 Burmese amber, Myanmar, Late Cretaceous (Cenomanian)
- †Priorparagia Brothers & Rasnitsyn, 2008
  - † Priorparagia anancites Brothers & Rasnitsyn, 2008 Orapa, Botswana, Late Cretaceous (Turonian)
