= Hunting wasp =

Group of wasps defined by their behaviour

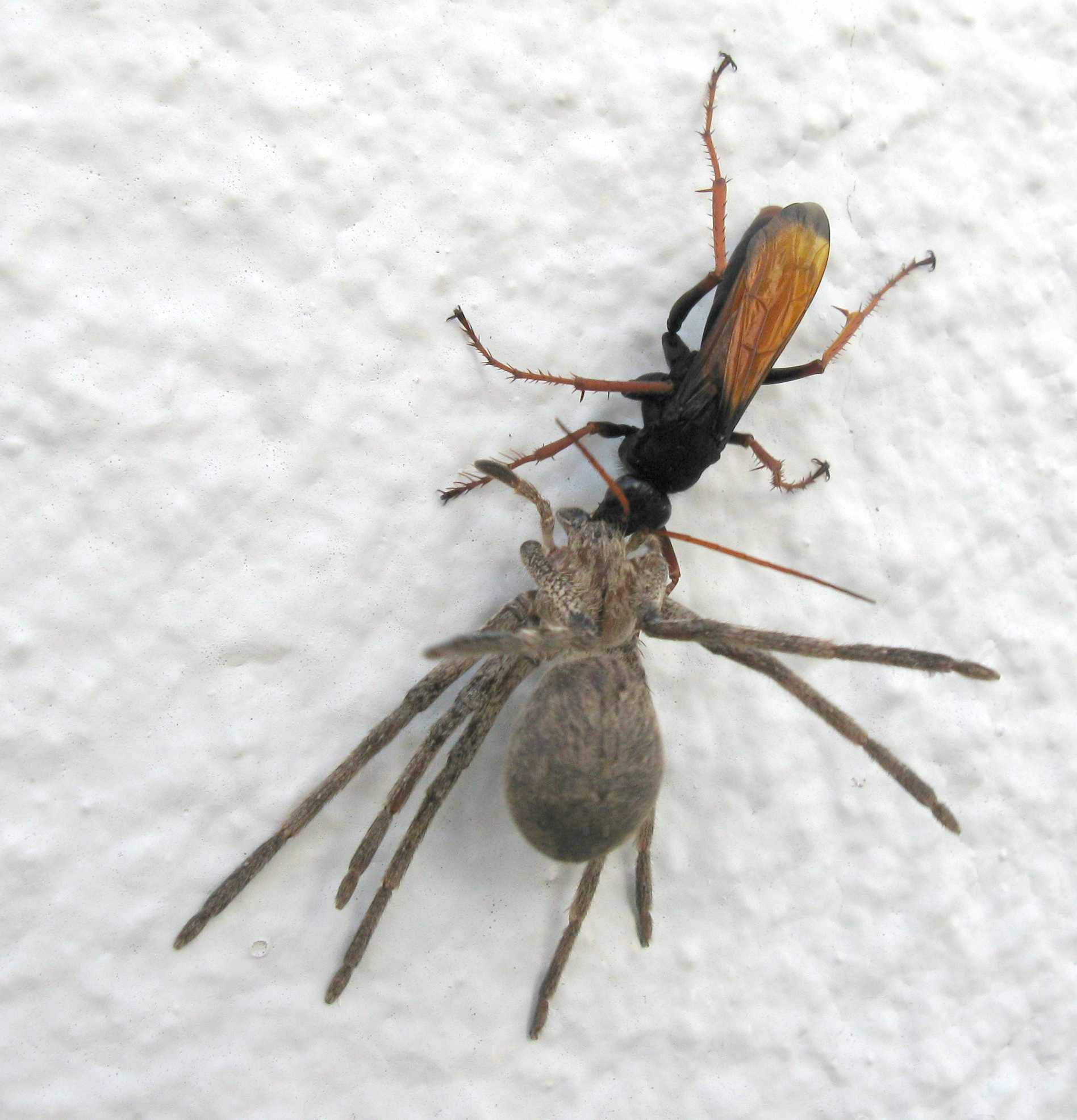
Pompilidae, Tachypompilus ignitus, a typical spider-hunting wasp, has paralysed a female Huntsman spider, and is dragging it up a wall to the intended shelter

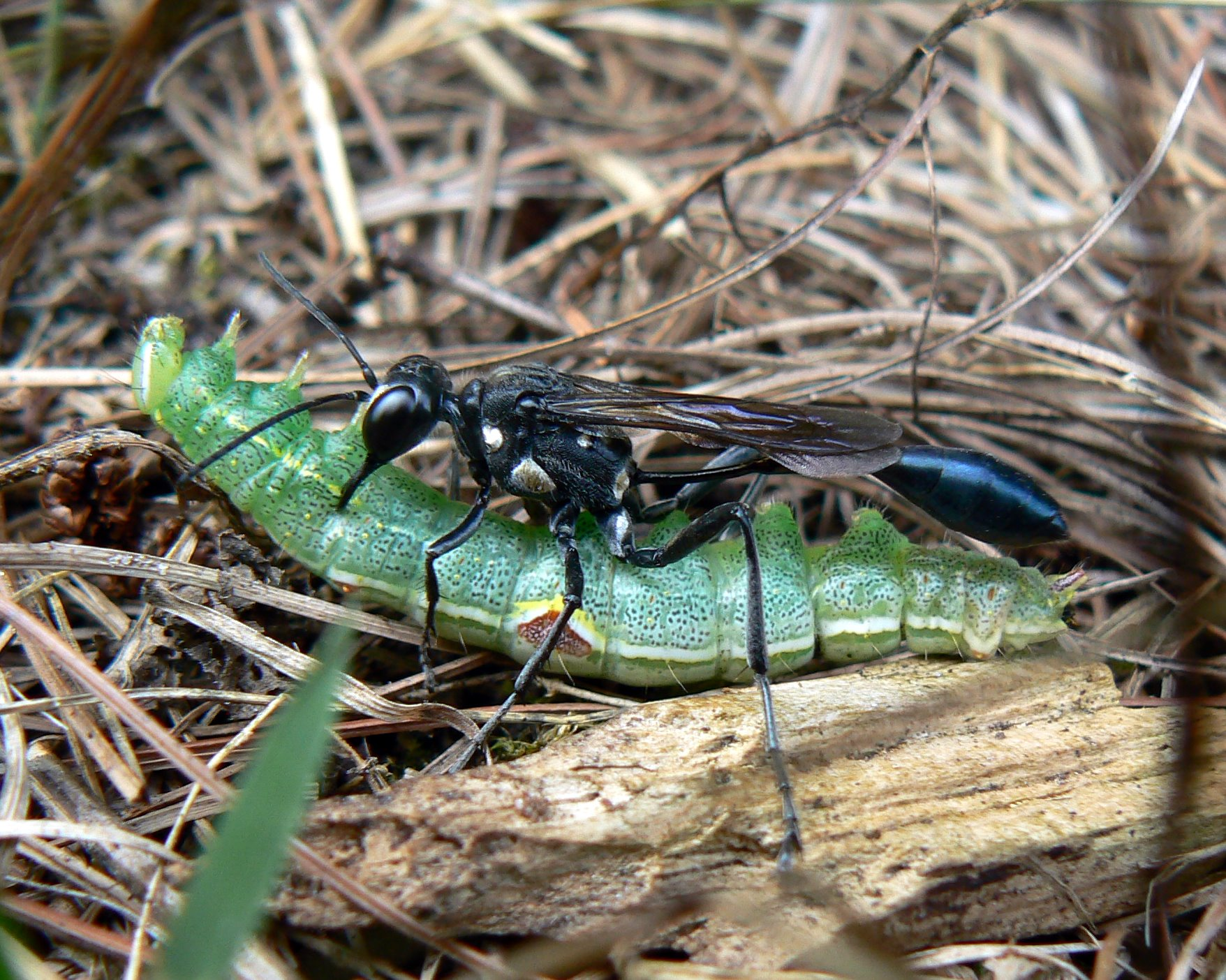
Sphecidae, Ammophilinae, Eremnophila aureonotata transporting a paralysed prominent caterpillar to the nest she has excavated

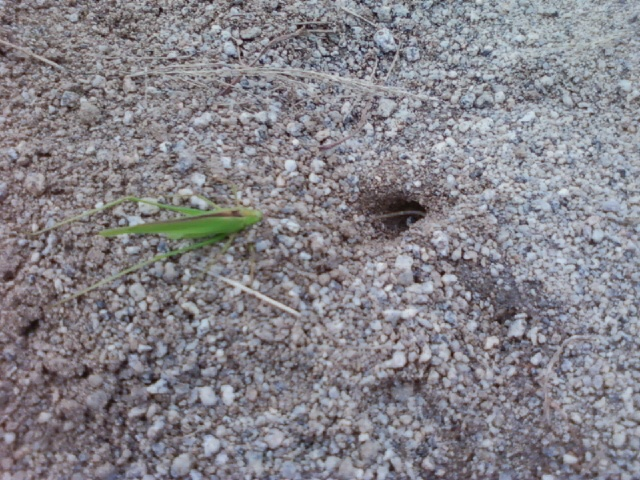
Katydid paralysed by a Sphecid wasp, and left outside the tunnel while the wasp performs a final inspection of the interior.

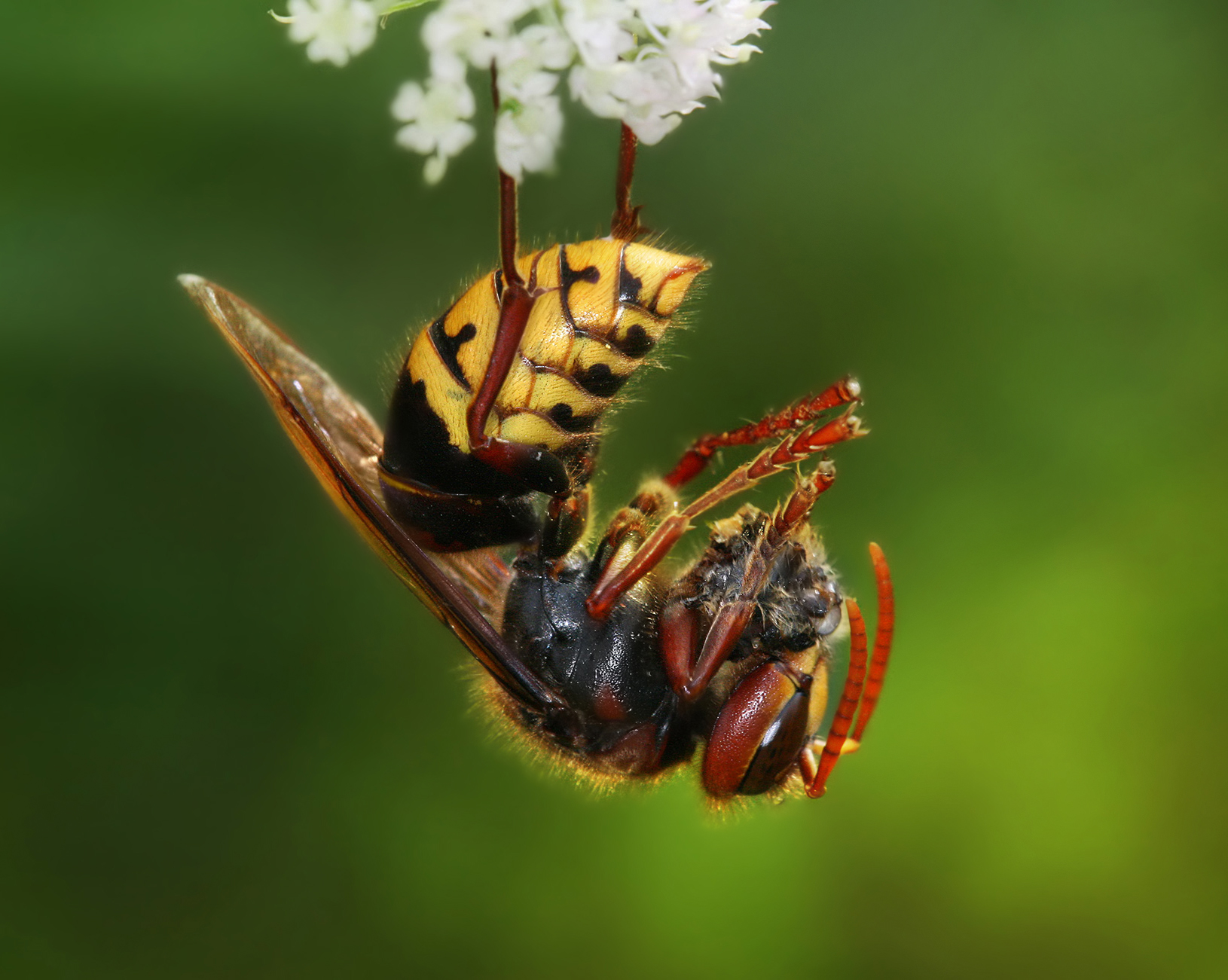
European hornet, Vespa crabro germana, butchering a bee before carrying the worthwhile portions back to the colony for the larvae.

Hunting wasps are members of various taxa of the insect order Hymenoptera. Their habits and affinities vary in many ways, but all practice parental care of their larvae in that they capture prey, usually insects, to feed their larvae. Whether solitary or social, most species construct some form of protection or nest in which they hide the prey and in which the larvae can feed and pupate in reasonable security.

Most solitary hunting wasps sting their prey in such a manner as to paralyse it without killing it. As a result it remains fresh for the young to eat. In contrast carnivorous social wasps generally feed prey piecemeal to the larvae as soon as they bring it back to the colony, so there is no need for preservation of the material. A minority of solitary hunting wasps, such as certain Bembicinae, also butcher their prey before feeding it to the larvae.

== Overview ==
Hunting wasp is not a biological taxon, but rather describes certain ecological strategies that occur within the Hymenoptera. All hunting wasps are members of the Aculeata, within the Apocrita, but not all Aculeata are hunting wasps. Nor are the hunting wasps a single clade within the Aculeata; they almost certainly have evolved independently several times, sometimes probably several times within the same family. Some superfamilies of the Hymenoptera (e.g. Chrysidoidea) include a few taxa that might fairly be called hunting wasps, but no superfamily includes only hunting wasps.

=== Distinction between hunting wasps and "solitary wasps" ===
In searching literature for "hunting wasps" it is prudent to include "solitary wasps" in the index terms. The two expressions have been used largely indiscriminately, especially in the very early days of modern entomology. Very few references to "hunting wasps" occur before about 1850, whereas references to "solitary wasps", though not plentiful, are not unusual.

Strictly speaking, the terms "solitary wasp" and "hunting wasp" are not interchangeable. The term "solitary wasp" simply describes wasps that are not social. Not all solitary wasps are hunting wasps, nor are all hunting wasps solitary. For example, parasitic wasps are solitary, but not hunting (though it is not common practice to refer to them as solitary). In addition, Masarinae are solitary, but not hunting (cf. Euparagia). And some species e.g. the Vespa and Polistes are hunting wasps, but not solitary, and often eusocial.

=== Taxonomy and biology ===
The taxa considered here are no more than a subset of those detailed in the article on the Apocrita. Nor are they listed here in the same sequence as in that article, but have been rearranged for convenience in discussing hunting wasp biology.

In comparing the various hunting wasp taxa listed here, it is of fundamental importance to bear the following point in mind: supposing that members of one taxon exhibit adaptations to a given life history or biological strategy, and that another taxon has similar adaptations apparently more sophisticated, that need not in itself imply that either is descended from, or relevantly related to, the other. The reason for mentioning such taxa in close context is purely for suggestive illustration. Where the ancestral record of the more sophisticated strategy is unavailable, it often may be reasonable to observe that intermediate stages resembling the mechanisms of extant forms could be perfectly viable. For example, it seems plausible that a digger wasp such as a member of the Sphecidae might have had an ancestor that simply hid prey in available tunnels in much the same way that some Bethylidae still do, but it does not follow that the extant digger Sphecidae are descendants of the Bethylidae.

Bearing this in mind, and that each of the superfamilies under discussion includes families other than those listed here, families that are in no way hunting wasps, consider the following, consulting the links and references for detailed discussion of the biology:

- Superfamily Chrysidoidea
  - Family Bethylidae

The Chrysidoidea are not normally regarded as other than parasitoids, parasites, and kleptoparasites. Nor are they seriously considered as hunting wasps in this article, but some members of the family Bethylidae do have very suggestive patterns of reproductive biology. Though the details vary, these members of largely parasitoidal wasp taxa hunt their prey, paralyse them in various ways, including malaxation, drag them off, and conceal them before laying eggs on them. Many variations on the theme occur in the family. Observation of such members of the Bethylidae provides material of great evolutionary interest. It strongly suggests that various forms of parasitoidal behaviour within the Hymenoptera independently provided preadaptation for the development of typical hunting wasp behaviour.

- Superfamily Apoidea

Although it had long been realised that bees were in essence a natural grouping of wasps that fed primarily on nectar and pollen, it took the development of molecular biology to demonstrate the actual grouping of true bees with the following families of definitive hunting wasps.

  - Family Ampulicidae

These cockroach wasps are a popular example of a primitive mode of hunting wasp behaviour; they do not build a secure nest for their prey plus its egg, but conceal it in the most convenient crack or burrow, in which respect their behaviour resembles that of some of the Bethylidae.

  - Family Crabronidae

A very large family with varied habits and a wide range of prey species. Crabronid species in some taxa concentrate on flies, others on bees, others on cicadas, but the overwhelming majority build tunnels, whether single or branched, with one or more larvae inside.

  - Family Sphecidae

These are a widely varied family, including the digger wasps and mud daubers

- Superfamily Vespoidea
  - Family Pompilidae (spider wasps)
  - Family Tiphiidae

These are generally large wasps that hunt subterranean insects, usually beetle larvae. Commonly they do little to conceal the paralysed prey, but lay the egg on it underground.

  - Family Vespidae

A European paper wasp takes a monarch butterfly caterpillar from within a narrow leaf milkweed umbel. Part is shown at one fourth speed.

Another large and varied family. They include the social wasps such as paper wasps and hornets. These are hunting wasps in the sense that they hunt animal food, generally insects, but they do not subtly paralyse them; instead they more or less butcher them and carry the most nutritious portions back to the colony to feed the young progressively. Other Vespidae include the solitary potter wasps, that are classical examples of hunting wasps of the kind that build their nests out of mud. The Masarinae or pollen wasps are the major exception in the family in that they do not hunt at all, but instead feed their larvae pollen and nectar, as many members of the superfamily Apoidea do.

== History in literature ==
The hunting wasps have long been known and have attracted the attention of generations of naturalists, but the term "hunting wasp" hardly appeared in literature published before the mid 19th century. Authors more often used the term "solitary wasp".

Probably the most notable early books on the subject were the French collections of essays by Jean Henri Fabre, which later were translated into English by Alexander Teixeira de Mattos in the early 20th century. There were earlier publications, usually informal, including some by deservedly prominent authors, such as the Peckhams, whose working lives overlapped that of Fabre. However, most works before the late 19th century tended to be isolated observations and now require cautious interpretation of the species concerned, partly because most authors were amateurs, and partly because very little work had yet been accomplished along the lines of modern taxonomy. This is no reason to disrespect the authors of the time; even a century later, advances in molecular biology have led to an upheaval in Hymenopteran taxonomy that, however necessary, is a source of cognitive dissonance in workers brought up in the 20th century tradition, and who, for example, never would have thought of classifying hunting wasp taxa among the Apoidea.
