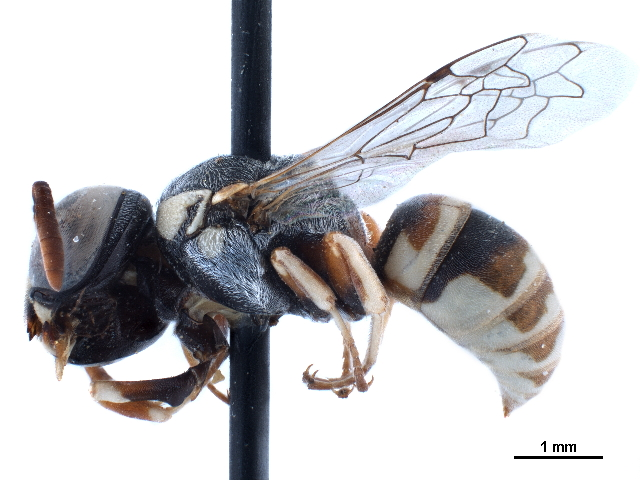
- Euparagia desertorum

Scientific classification
- Domain: Eukaryota
- Kingdom: Animalia
- Phylum: Arthropoda
- Class: Insecta
- Order: Hymenoptera
- Family: Vespidae
- Subfamily: Euparagiinae
- Genus: Euparagia; Cresson, 1879

Type species
- Euparagia scutellaris Cresson, 1879

Species
- See text

= Euparagia =

Genus of wasps

Euparagia is a genus of wasps in the family Vespidae, the only extant genus in the subfamily Euparagiinae.

== Species ==
The following species are classified within the genus Euparagia:

- Euparagia boregoensis Bohart, 1948
- Euparagia desertorum Bohart, 1948
- Euparagia maculiceps (Cameron, 1904)
- Euparagia platiniceps Bohart, 1938
- Euparagia richardsi Bohart & Krombein 1979
- Euparagia scutellaris Cresson, 1879
- Euparagia siccata Bohart, 1988
- Euparagia timberlakei Bohart, 1948
- Euparagia unidentata Carpenter & Kimsey, 2009
- Euparagia yuma Bohart, 1988

== Biology ==
Euparagia wasps are little known and the biology of only one species, Euparagia scutellaris, is known, and the females provision nests in the soil with weevil larvae.
