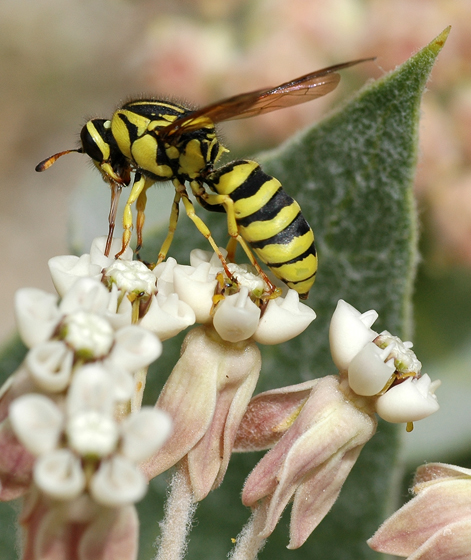

Scientific classification
- Kingdom: Animalia
- Phylum: Arthropoda
- Class: Insecta
- Order: Hymenoptera
- Family: Vespidae
- Genus: Pseudomasaris
- Species: P. coquilletti

Binomial name
- Pseudomasaris coquilletti Rohwer, 1911

= Pseudomasaris coquilletti =

Species of wasp

Pseudomasaris coquilletti is a species of pollen wasp in the family Vespidae. This species can be found in Oregon, California, Utah, and Arizona.
