= Bohart =

Bohart may refer to:

- Richard M. Bohart (1913–2007), American entomologist
- Catherine Bohart (b. 1988), Irish stand-up comedian
- Bohart Museum of Entomology, California
