= Insectivore =

Organism which eats insects

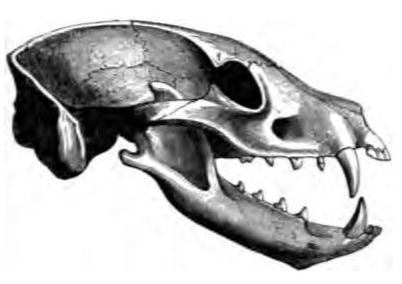
This aardwolf skull exhibits greatly reduced molars and carnassials teeth as they are unnecessary for any large, insectivorous animal subsisting on soft insects such as termites. The dentition of a shrew is very different. The aardwolf uses its canine teeth in self-defence; accordingly, they have not been greatly reduced.

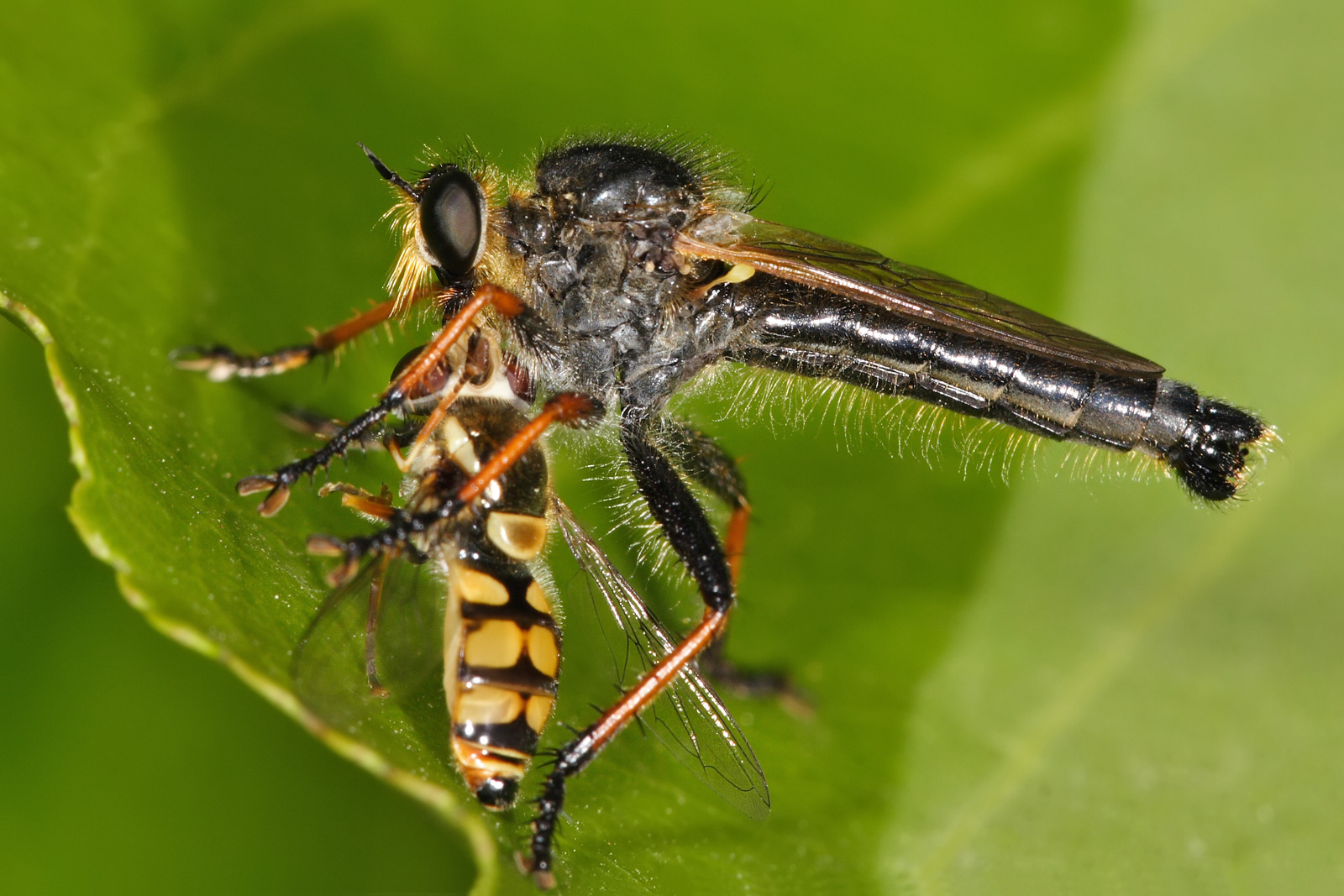
A robber fly eating a hoverfly

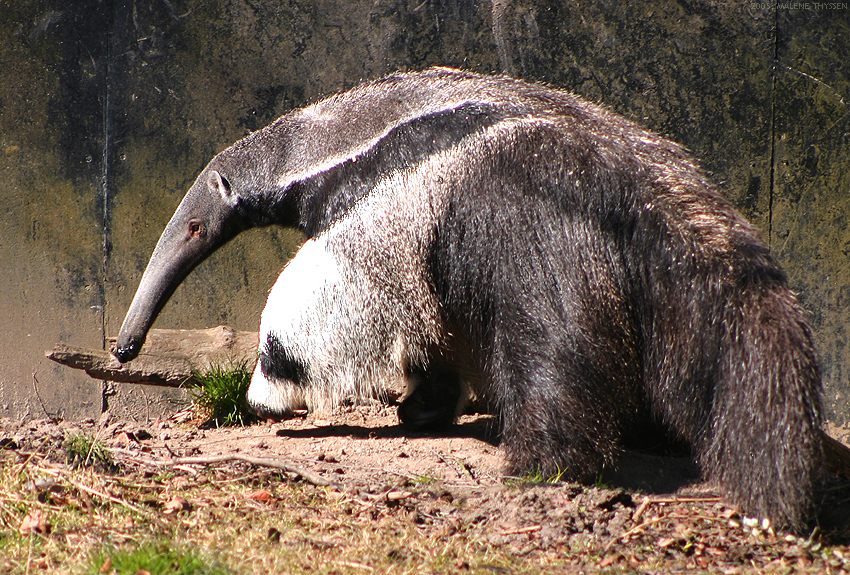
The giant anteater, a large insectivorous mammal

An insectivore is a carnivorous animal or plant which eats insects. An alternative term is entomophage, which can also refer to the human practice of eating insects.

The first vertebrate insectivores were amphibians. When they evolved 400 million years ago, the first amphibians were piscivores, with numerous sharp conical teeth, much like a modern crocodile. The same tooth arrangement is however also suited for eating animals with exoskeletons, thus the ability to eat insects can stem from piscivory.

At one time, insectivorous mammals were scientifically classified in an order called Insectivora. This order is now abandoned, as not all insectivorous mammals are closely related. Most of the Insectivora taxa have been reclassified; those that have not yet been reclassified and found to be truly related to each other remain in the order Eulipotyphla.

Although individually small, insects exist in enormous numbers. Insects make up a very large part of the animal biomass in almost all non-marine, non-polar environments. It has been estimated that the global insect biomass is in the region of 10^{12} kg (one billion tons) with an estimated population of 10^{18} (one billion billion, or quintillion) organisms. Many creatures depend on insects for their primary diet, and many that do not (and are thus not technically insectivores) nevertheless use insects as a protein supplement, particularly when they are breeding.

== Examples ==
Examples of insectivores include different kinds of species of carp, opossum, frogs, lizards (e.g. chameleons, geckos), nightingales, swallows, echidnas, numbats, anteaters, armadillos, aardvarks, pangolins, aardwolfs, bats, and spiders. Even large mammals are recorded as eating insects; the sloth bear is perhaps the largest insectivore. Insects also can be insectivores; examples are dragonflies, hornets, ladybugs, robber flies, and praying mantises. Insectivory also features to various degrees amongst primates, such as marmosets, tamarins, tarsiers, galagos and aye-aye. There is some suggestion that the earliest primates were nocturnal, arboreal insectivores.

== Insectivorous plants ==
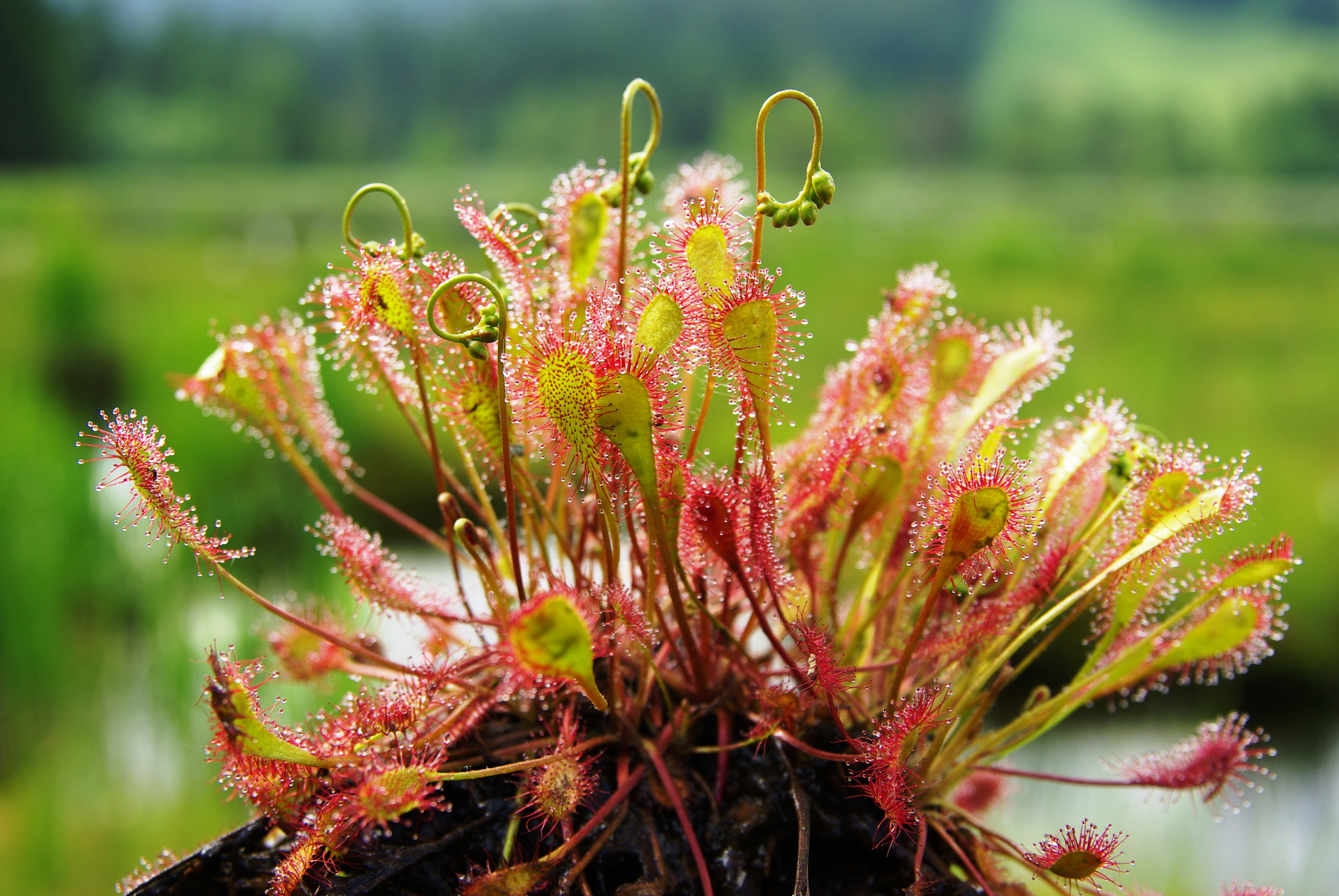
Drosera species

Insectivorous plants are plants that derive some of their nutrients from trapping and consuming animals or protozoan. The benefit they derive from their catch varies considerably; in some species, it might include a small part of their nutrient intake and in others it might be an indispensable source of nutrients. As a rule, however, such animal food, however valuable it might be as a source of certain critically important minerals, is not the plants' major source of energy, which they generally derive mainly from photosynthesis.

Insectivorous plants might consume insects and other animal material trapped adventitiously. However, most species to which such food represents an important part of their intake are specifically, often spectacularly, adapted to attract and secure adequate supplies. Their prey animals typically, but not exclusively, comprise insects and other arthropods. Plants highly adapted to reliance on animal food use a variety of mechanisms to secure their prey, such as pitfalls, sticky surfaces, hair-trigger snaps, bladder-traps, entangling furriness, and lobster-pot trap mechanisms. Also known as carnivorous plants, they appear adapted to grow in places where the soil is thin or poor in nutrients, especially nitrogen, such as acidic bogs and rock outcroppings.

Insectivorous plants include the Venus flytrap, several types of pitcher plants, butterworts, sundews, bladderworts, the waterwheel plant, brocchinia and many members of the Bromeliaceae. The list is far from complete, and some plants, such as Roridula species, exploit the prey organisms mainly in a mutualistic relationship with other creatures, such as resident organisms that contribute to the digestion of prey. In particular, animal prey organisms supply carnivorous plants with nitrogen, but they also are important sources of various other soluble minerals, such as potassium and trace elements that are in short supply in environments where the plants flourish. This gives them a decisive advantage over other plants, whereas in nutrient-rich soils they tend to be out-competed by plants adapted to aggressive growth where nutrient supplies are not the major constraints.

Technically these plants are not strictly insectivorous, as they consume any animal that they can secure and consume; the distinction is trivial, however, because not many primarily insectivorous organisms exclusively consume insects. Most of those that do have such a restrictive diet, such as certain parasitoids and hunting wasps, are specialized to exploit particular species, not insects in general. Indeed, much as large mantids and spiders will do, the larger varieties of pitcher plants have been known to consume vertebrates such as small rodents and lizards. Charles Darwin wrote the first well-known treatise on carnivorous plants in 1875.

== See also ==
- Entomophagy
- Consumer-resource systems
- Insectivora
- List of feeding behaviours
- The dictionary definition of insectivore at Wiktionary
