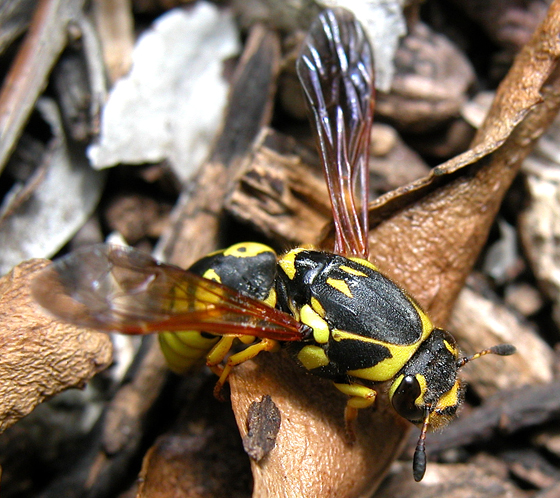

Scientific classification
- Kingdom: Animalia
- Phylum: Arthropoda
- Clade: Pancrustacea
- Class: Insecta
- Order: Hymenoptera
- Family: Vespidae
- Genus: Pseudomasaris
- Species: P. vespoides

Binomial name
- Pseudomasaris vespoides (Cresson, 1863)

= Pseudomasaris vespoides =

Species of wasp

Pseudomasaris vespoides, the large pollen wasp, is a species of pollen wasp in the family Vespidae. This species can be found in the western United States as well as Baja California. The species specializes in collecting pollen from penstemon flowers.
