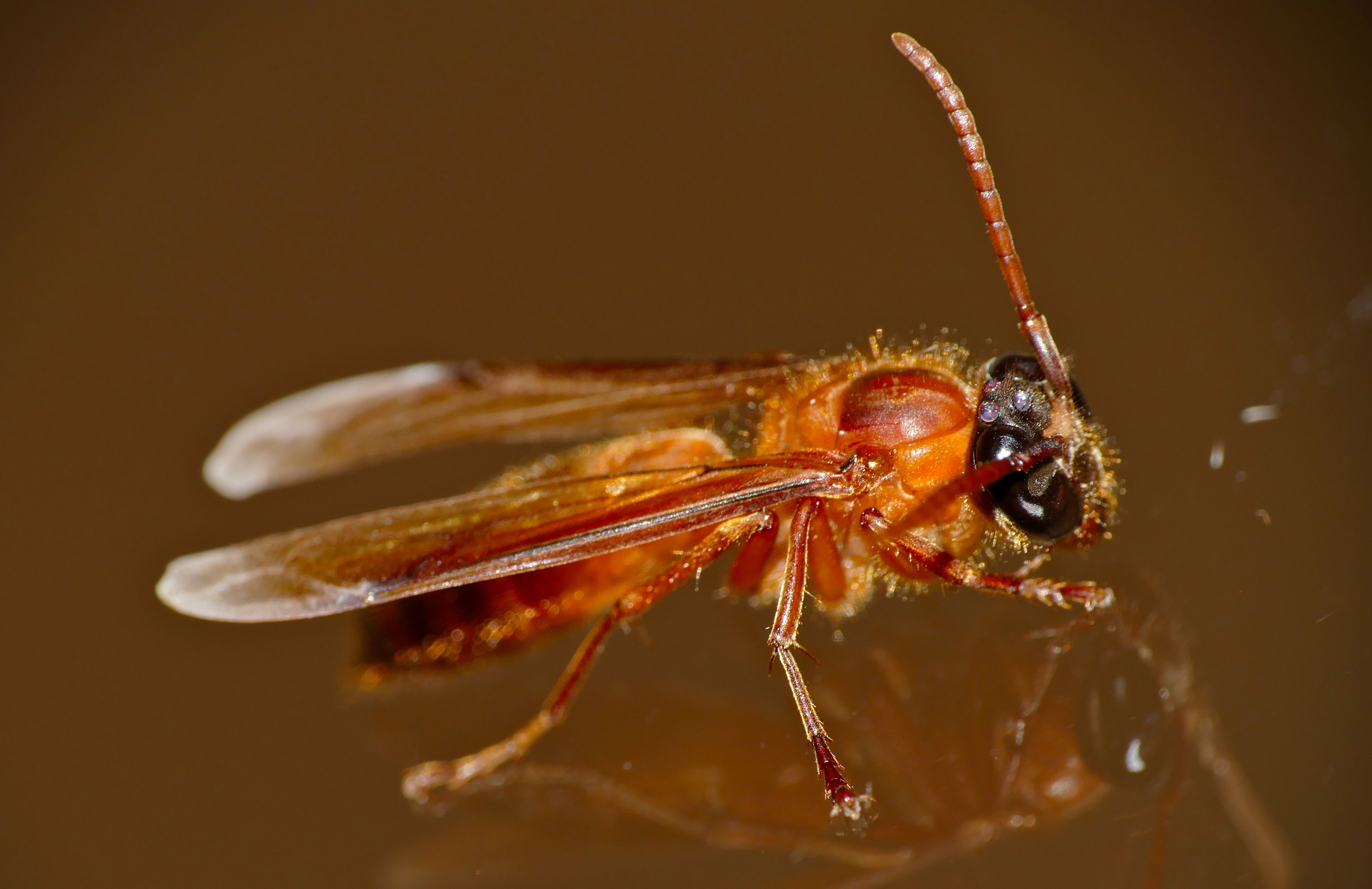

Scientific classification
- Kingdom: Animalia
- Phylum: Arthropoda
- Clade: Pancrustacea
- Class: Insecta
- Order: Hymenoptera
- Family: Vespidae
- Subfamily: Vespinae
- Genus: Provespa; Ashmead, 1903

Type species
- Vespa dorylloides (= Vespa anomala) de Saussure, 1854

Species
- See text

= Provespa =

Genus of wasps

Provespa is a small genus of Vespidae, made up of nocturnal wasps from Southeast Asia, sometimes referred to as "night wasps" or "night hornets", though they are not true hornets (genus Vespa). They are the only nocturnal members of the subfamily Vespinae, and also the only vespines where new colonies are formed by swarming (one queen attended by a large number of workers, similar to honey bees). They tend to build their nests from fibrous plant material, making them a uniform greyish brown colour which is often difficult to locate.

== Species ==
- Provespa anomala (Saussure, 1854)
- Provespa barthelemyi (Buysson, 1905)
- Provespa nocturna Vecht, 1935
