= C. W. Woodworth Award =

The C. W. Woodworth Award is an annual award presented by the Pacific Branch of the Entomological Society of America. This award, the PBESA's largest, is for achievement in entomology in the Pacific region of the United States over the previous ten years. The award is named in honor of Charles W. Woodworth and was established on June 25, 1968. It is principally sponsored by Woodworth's great-grandson, Brian Holden, and his wife, Joann Wilfert, with additional support by Dr. Craig W. and Kathryn Holden, and Dr. Jim and Betty Woodworth.

== Award recipients ==
Source: Entomological Society of America

List of recipients
2025	Dr. Douglas B. Walsh	Washington State University	57th
2024	Dr. Elizabeth Beers	Washington State University	56th
2023	Dr. Robert Page	Arizona State University	55th
2022	Dr. Mark Hoddle	University of California, Riverside	54th
2021	Dr. Kent Daane	University of California, Kearney Research and Extension Center	53rd
2020	Dr. Lynn Kimsey	University of California, Davis	52nd
2019	Dr. Elizabeth Grafton-Cardwell	University of California, Riverside	51st
2018	Dr. Roger Vargas	USDA Agricultural Research Service, Hilo	50th
2017	Dr. Gerhard & Dr. Regine Gries	Simon Fraser University	49th
2016	Dr. Timothy Paine	University of California, Riverside	48th
2015	Dr. Thomas W. Scott	University of California, Davis	47th
2014	Dr. James R. Carey	University of California, Davis	46th
2013	Dr. Vincent P. Jones	Washington State University	45th
2012	Dr. Stephan Naranjo	USDA Agricultural Research Service, Maricopa	44th
2011	Dr. Frank G. Zalom	University of California, Davis	43rd
2010	Dr. Walter S. Leal	University of California, Davis	42nd
2009	Dr. Charles G. Summers	University of California, Kearney Research and Extension Center	41st
2008	Dr. Brian Federici	University of California, Riverside	40th
2007	Dr. Nick Toscano	University of California, Riverside	39th
2006	Dr. Jocelyn Millar	University of California, Riverside	38th
2005	Dr. John D. Stark	Washington State University	37th
2004	Dr. Victoria Y. Yokoyama	USDA Agricultural Research Service, Parlier	36th
2003	Dr. Keith S. Pike	Washington State University	35th
2002	Dr. James Hagler	USDA Western Cotton Research Laboratory	34th
2001	Dr. Robert S. Lane	University of California, Berkeley	33rd
2000	Dr. Jay F. Brunner	Washington State University	32nd
1999	Dr. Wyatt W. Cone	Washington State University	31st
1998	Dr. Harry Kaya	University of California, Davis	30th
1997	Dr. Jacqueline L. Robertson	USDA Pacific Southwest Research Station	29th
1996	Dr. Marshall W. Johnson	University of California, Riverside	28th
1995	Dr. Nabil N. Youssef	Utah State University	27th
1994	Dr. Michael K. Rust	University of California, Riverside	26th
1993	Dr. Brian Croft	Oregon State University	25th
1992	Dr. Wallace C. Mitchell	University of Hawaii, Manoa	24th
1991	Dr. Thomas F. Leigh	University of California, Davis	23rd
1990	Dr. Philip F. Torchio	Utah State University	22nd
1989	Dr. Stanley C. Hoyt	Washington State University	21st
1988	Dr. John R. Anderson	North Carolina State University	20th
1987	Dr. Robert Washino	University of California, Davis	19th
1986	Dr. Roy Fukuto	University of California, Riverside	18th
1985	Dr. Carl A. Johansen	Washington State University	17th
1983	Dr. George Tamaki	USDA ARS, Yakima	15th
1982	Dr. Paul Oman	Oregon State University	14th
1981	Dr. Harry Laidlaw	University of California, Davis	13th
1980	Dr. George P. Georghiou	University of California, Riverside	12th
1979	Dr. William G. Wellington	University of British Columbia	11th
1978	Dr. William Harry Lange Jr.	University of California, Davis	10th
1977	Dr. Paul DeBach	University of California, Riverside	9th
1976	Dr. D. Elmo Hardy	University of California, Berkeley	8th
1975	Dr. Melville H. Hatch	University of Washington	7th
1974	Dr. Walter Ebeling	University of California, Los Angeles	6th
1973	Dr. Carl Barton Huffaker	University of California, Berkeley	5th
1972	Dr. Hartford Keifer	Department of Food and Agriculture, CA	4th
1971	Dr. Ray F. Smith	University of California, Berkeley	3rd
1970	Dr. Walter Carter	Pineapple Research Institute	2nd
1969	Dr. Maurice T. James	Washington State University	1st

A box containing the older records of the PBESA and which likely contains the names of the first few recipients of the award is located in the special collections section of the library at U.C. Davis.

== See also ==
- The John Henry Comstock Graduate Student Award
- List of biology awards
