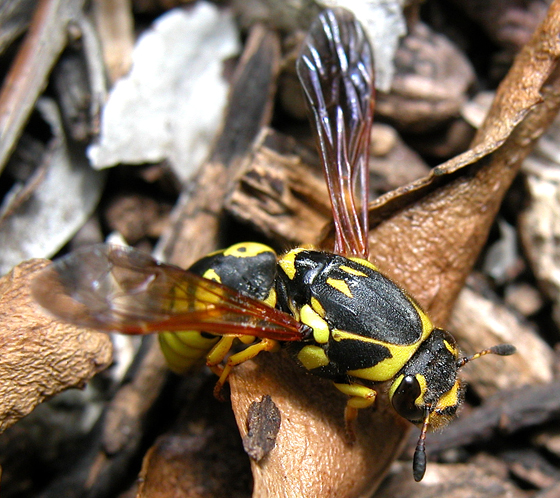
- Pseudomasaris vespoides

Scientific classification
- Domain: Eukaryota
- Kingdom: Animalia
- Phylum: Arthropoda
- Class: Insecta
- Order: Hymenoptera
- Family: Vespidae
- Subfamily: Masarinae
- Genus: Pseudomasaris; Ashmead, 1902

Species
- 15 sp., see text

= Pseudomasaris =

Genus of wasps

Pseudomasaris is a genus of pollen wasps of the family Vespidae, found in arid regions of western North America. They feed their larvae on the pollen and nectar of a variety of plants, though many species prefer flowers in the genus Phacelia. They are colored black with yellow or white markings that, in a few species, resemble the coloration of yellowjackets.

== Species ==
Pseudomasaris contains 15 species:

- Pseudomasaris basirufus Rohwer, 1912
- Pseudomasaris cazieri Bohart, 1963
- Pseudomasaris coquilletti Rohwer, 1911
- Pseudomasaris edwardsii (Cresson, 1872)
- Pseudomasaris macneilli Bohart, 1963
- Pseudomasaris macswaini Bohart, 1963
- Pseudomasaris maculifrons (Fox, 1894)
- Pseudomasaris marginalis (Cresson, 1864)
- Pseudomasaris micheneri Bohart, 1963
- Pseudomasaris occidentalis (Cresson, 1871)
- Pseudomasaris phaceliae Rohwer, 1912
- Pseudomasaris texanus (Cresson, 1871)
- Pseudomasaris vespoides (Cresson, 1863)
- Pseudomasaris wheeleri Bequard, 1929
- Pseudomasaris zonalis (Cresson, 1864)
