= Vincent Brothers =

American mass murderer on death row (born 1962)

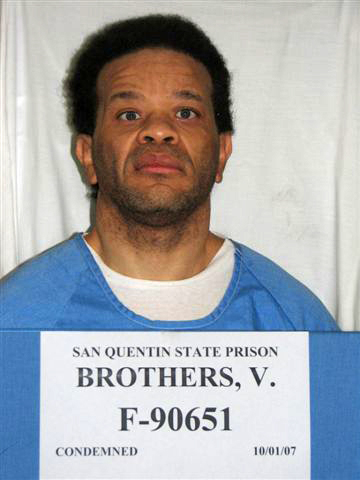
- Born: Vincent Edward Brothers; May 31, 1962 (age 64); Bellport, New York, U.S.
- Conviction: First-degree murder with special circumstances (5 counts)
- Penalty: Death (September 27, 2007)

Details
- Victims: 5
- Date: July 6, 2003
- Country: United States
- State: California
- Date apprehended: April 2004
- Imprisoned at: California Health Care Facility

Vincent Edward Brothers (born May 31, 1962) is an American mass murderer convicted of killing his wife, their three children and his mother-in-law. Brothers previously was the former vice principal of John C. Fremont Elementary School in Bakersfield, California and holds a master's degree in education from California State University Bakersfield and a bachelor's degree from Norfolk State University.

Brothers, who had months earlier married his wife for the second time, was convicted of killing her, their new baby, two toddlers and his mother-in-law on July 6, 2003. He attempted to create an alibi by flying to Columbus, Ohio, under the pretext of visiting his brother. He drove his rental car to Bakersfield, murdered his family members, and returned to Ohio. Forensic analysis of the rental car showed insects native to states west of the Rocky Mountains and odometer readings that supported the round-trip to California. Brothers was convicted of first-degree murders with special circumstance of multiple murder and was ultimately sentenced to death.

== Murders ==
Brothers first gained national attention after the July 6, 2003, deaths of his wife, Joanie (née Harper), his sons, Marques (four) and Marshall (six weeks), his daughter, Lyndsey (two), and his mother-in-law, Earnestine Harper. Earnestine (70) was a mother of five children and a civil rights activist. Joanie (39) worked for the Bakersfield school system and was a division one basketball official. Vincent and Joanie married in 2000 but had the marriage annulled in September 2001 due to Brothers' infidelity. They remarried in January 2003 when Joanie was pregnant with their third child. Vincent moved out of the house in April 2003.

Joanie, her mother and the children were last seen at church on July 6, 2003, and their bodies were discovered shot to death on Tuesday, July 8 in what appeared to be a staged break-in. Brothers had turned himself in to authorities in North Carolina where he was visiting his mother, but was released after a few hours due to lack of evidence at that time. Brothers returned to Los Angeles on July 11, 2003. He did not attend the memorial service for his wife, children, and mother-in-law, but attended their funeral on Wednesday, July 16. Although considered the only suspect from the beginning, he was not arrested until April 2004.

== Trial ==
During the trial in 2007, the "biggest criminal trial in Bakersfield in decades", prosecutors emphasized Brothers' past marriage difficulties. Joanie Harper previously divorced him in 2000, but the couple remarried in Las Vegas in 2003. Brothers was also known to have extramarital affairs, and further compromised his case by lying while on the witness stand. According to Lisa Green, a Kern County deputy district attorney, Brothers killed his family because they were a financial burden and he lied on the stand 41 or more times.

Brothers had flown to Columbus, Ohio for a long July 4 holiday weekend, drove a rental car approximately 2,000 miles to Bakersfield to kill his family after they returned home from church on July 6, and drove back to Ohio and North Carolina. The trip was intended to be an alibi, but several hundred dead insects found on the rental car and odometer readings showed that Brothers had driven to Bakersfield. Although Brothers stated that he flew to Columbus to visit his brother and had not traveled to California from Ohio, expert witnesses from the University of California-Davis' Bohart Museum of Entomology stated that some insects found on the rental car's radiator and air filter were from states west of the Rocky Mountains. Lynn Kimsey, a UC-Davis professor of entomology and museum director, stated that, "The insects we found were consistent with two major routes to get to California from the East," and court testimony showed that the round trip accounted for the 4,500 miles on the rental car.

Brothers' activity between July 2 and July 8
Wednesday July 2	Thursday or Friday July 3 or 4	Sunday July 6	Monday July 7	Tuesday July 8
Flew to Columbus, Ohio (Note: To establish an alibi, Brothers flew to Columbus, Ohio to visit his brother, Melvin. There he rented a Dodge Neon.)	Drove to Bakersfield	Murdered his family	Returned to Ohio late Monday	Drove with his brother Melvin to North Carolina. Joanie, her three children, and her mother were found dead.

On May 15, 2007, Brothers was convicted of the first-degree murders of his five family members after jurors heard testimony from 137 witnesses. Brothers is believed to have used a .22-caliber gun and "a stabbing weapon". His conviction carried the special circumstance of multiple murder. On May 29, 2007, the jury returned a sentence of death. According to sheriff's department spokesman Sgt. Ed Komin, detention deputies found that Brothers had hid handmade handcuff keys in his hair and had placed his leg restraints on one leg, which rendered them ineffective. He was returned to Lerdo Jail under additional security measures.

== Sentence ==
On September 27, 2007, the Superior Court Judge Michael Bush sentenced Brothers to death based upon the jury's verdict and ordered Brothers to pay restitution. He was later placed into the custody of the California Department of Corrections and placed on death row at San Quentin State Prison. He was later transferred to California Health Care Facility, Stockton.

== Relationship history ==
Brothers had been married four times, was briefly incarcerated for spousal abuse, and has a surviving daughter, Margaret Kern Brothers, who was the daughter of his girlfriend while attending California State University Bakersfield. In 1988, Brothers was convicted of misdemeanor spousal abuse. He received a six-day jail sentence and was put on probation. He married for a second time in 1992 and the following year his wife sued for divorce claiming that he threatened to kill her and was violent. In 1996, Brothers sexually harassed a woman who worked at the school where he worked as vice principal. She claims that during a visit to his home he hit her and was dissuaded by the police from filing a formal complaint against a man considered a "respected community leader". During an investigation by the school, Brothers denied the allegations and was warned of the effect of such behavior on his career, but he was not formally disciplined.

== Wrongful death settlement ==
Harper family members received an undisclosed amount in a wrongful death suit to recoup the costs of funeral expenses and ensure that any monies of King Ross Brothers went to the only surviving child of Vincent Brothers and Joanie's stepdaughter. Margaret Kern Brothers disowned her father and changed her surname following the mass murder.

== See also ==
- List of death row inmates in the United States § California
