= Melville Hatch =

American entomologist (1898–1988)

- Born: November 25, 1898; Detroit, Michigan, United States
- Died: January 19, 1988 (aged 89); Seattle, Washington, United States
- Education: B.A., University of Michigan; M.A., University of Michigan; Ph.D., University of Michigan
- Occupations: professor, scientist
- Employer: University of Washington
- Known for: Beetles of the Pacific Northwest (1971); the "Melville Hatch Beetle Collection" at Oregon State University

Melville Harrison Hatch (1898–1988) was an American entomologist who specialized in the study of beetles. His long career at the University of Washington was highlighted by the publication of the seminal, five-volume work Beetles of the Pacific Northwest. Hatch is responsible for the identification and naming of 13 species.

== Early life and education ==
Melville Hatch was born in Detroit, Michigan and attended Detroit Central High School. He began collecting insects at age 15 and went on to study biology at the University of Michigan, from where he graduated in 1919, afterwards going on to earn a Ph.D. in 1928.

== Career ==
Hatch had teaching positions at Millikin University and the University of Minnesota before becoming an assistant professor at the University of Washington. He later became the chair of the zoology department after Trevor Kincaid's retirement. In 1962, Hatch was appointed as the curator of entomology at the Burke Museum of Natural History. From 1959 to 1967, he served as the editor of "The Biologist," a magazine published by Phi Sigma.

In 1937 Hatch founded The Scarabs, a Seattle social club focused on discussion of insects, and was elected "High Scarab," a post he would hold until the early 1970s. (Members of The Scarabs have included Robert Michael Pyle and the noted Polish anthropologist Borys Malkin.) In 1950 he authored a survey of scientific studies based on Trevor Kincaid's research, Studies Honoring Trevor Kincaid.

In 1949 Hatch served on the University of Washington's Committee on Tenure and Academic Freedom, which considered the case of several faculty members who had been charged with "subversive communist activity." He was part of the majority that endorsed the dismissal of three. The committee, while making strong denunciations of communism, found no good cause to dismiss three other admitted communist faculty members and recommended their retention. Rod Crawford, the curator of arachnids at the Burke Museum, would later note that Hatch's "essays show clearly enough that he had as little sympathy with Communist ideology as any Cold War American."

Hatch's five-volume magnum opus, Beetles of the Pacific Northwest, was published in 1971. The mammoth work, considered a seminal guide to beetles in the Pacific Northwest, took Hatch 23 years to finish. In the late 1970s, Hatch's collection of more than half-a-million beetles was transferred to Oregon State University where it was designated the "Melville Hatch Beetle Collection." Hatch was the recipient of the C. W. Woodworth Award in 1975.

== Death ==
Melville Hatch died in Seattle, Washington in 1988.

== Selected publications ==
- Meeuse, B. J., & Hatch, M. H. (1960). Beetle pollination in Dracunculus and Sauromatum (Araceae). The Coleopterists Bulletin, 70–74.
- Hatch, M. H. (1957). The North American status of Meligethes nigrescens Steph.(Nitidulidae). The Coleopterists Bulletin, 65–66.
- Hatch, M. H. (1940). Observations on Silphinae with a note on intraspecific variations and their designation. Journal of the New York Entomological Society, 233–244.
- Hatch, M. H. (1949). Studies on the fauna of Pacific Northwest greenhouses (Isopoda, Coleoptera, Dermaptera, Orthoptera, Gastropoda). Journal of the New York Entomological Society, : 141–165.
- Hatch, M. H. (1939). Records of terrestrial Isopoda or sow bugs from North America. American Midland Naturalist, 21(1), 256–257.
- Hatch, M. H. (1938). Report on the Coleoptera collected by Dr. Victor B. Scheffer on the Aleutian Islands in 1937. The Pan Pacific Entomologist, 14(4), 145–149.
- Hatch, M. H. (1936). Studies on Leiodidae. Journal of the New York Entomological Society, 33–41.
- Hatch, M. H. (1933). Studies on the Leptodiridae (Catopidae) with descriptions of new species. Journal of the New York Entomological Society, 187–239.
- Brown, C. R., & Hatch, M. H. (1929). Orientation and" fright" reactions of whirligig beetles (Gyrinidae). Journal of Comparative Psychology, 9(2), 159.
- Hatch, M. H. (1928). Studies on Dytiscidae. Bulletin of the Brooklyn Entomological Society, 23, 217–229.
- Hatch, M. H. (1927). Studies on the Silphinae. Journal of the New York Entomological Society, 331–371.
