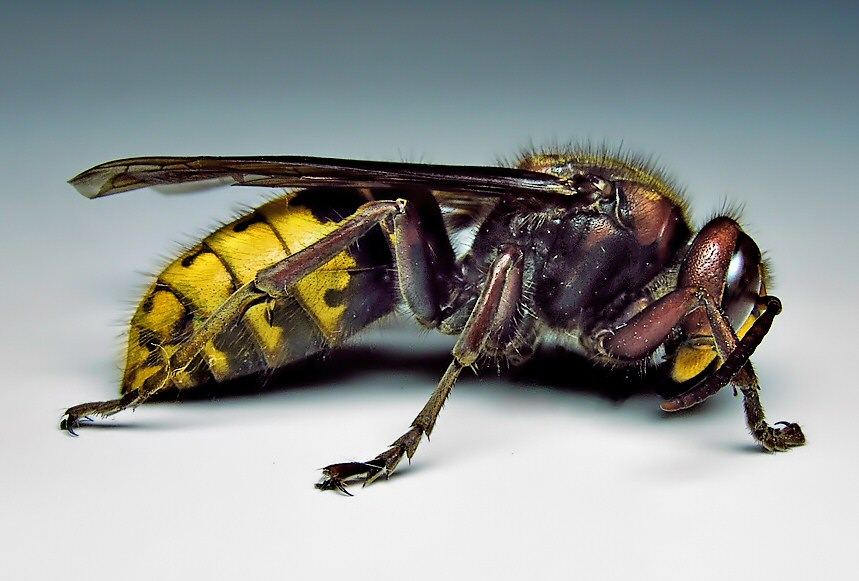
- European hornet, Vespa crabro

Scientific classification
- Kingdom: Animalia
- Phylum: Arthropoda
- Clade: Pancrustacea
- Class: Insecta
- Order: Hymenoptera
- Family: Vespidae
- Subfamily: Vespinae; Latreille, 1802

Genera
- Dolichovespula; †Palaeovespa; Provespa; Vespa; Vespula

= Vespinae =

Vespinae Temporal range: Thanetian–Recent

Subfamily of wasps

The subfamily Vespinae contains the largest and best-known groups of eusocial wasps, including true hornets (the genus Vespa), and the "yellowjackets" (genera Dolichovespula and Vespula). The remaining genus, Provespa, is a small, poorly known group of nocturnal wasps from Southeast Asia. One extinct genus, Palaeovespa, has been described in the Paleocene to Eocene fossil records of North America and Europe. Collectively, the group can be found on all continents except Antarctica, and several of these wasps are invasive species, introduced beyond their native ranges, and can be major pests.

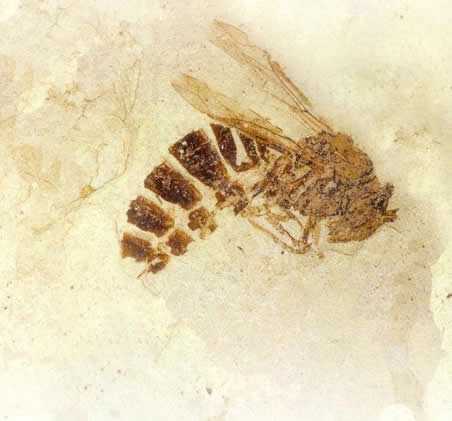
Palaeovespa florissantia, an extinct wasp
