= Charles W. Woodworth =

American entomologist (1865–1940)

Charles William Woodworth (April 28, 1865 – November 19, 1940) was an American entomologist. He published extensively in entomology and founded the Entomology Department at the University of California, Berkeley. He was the first person to breed the model organism Drosophila melanogaster (fruit fly) in captivity and to suggest to early genetic researchers at Harvard its use for scientific research. He spent four years at the University of Nanking, China, where he effected the practical control of the city's mosquitoes. He drafted and lobbied for California's first insecticide law and administered the law for 12 years. The Pacific Branch of the Entomological Society of America named its annual career achievement award the C. W. Woodworth Award.

== Birth and early life ==
He was born in Champaign, Illinois, on April 28, 1865, to Alvin Oakley Woodworth and Mary Celina (Carpenter) Woodworth. His father was a merchant but died when Charles was four. Some years later, his mother married Alvin's older brother Stephen Elias Woodworth to help raise Charles and his older brother Howard. Stephen had earlier been a resident of Seneca Falls, New York, and was a signatory of the 1848 Seneca Falls Declaration of Sentiments.

== Career overview ==
Charles graduated with a BS in 1885 and an MS in 1886 from the University of Illinois at Urbana-Champaign. The funds received from the judgment in the 1884 U.S. Supreme Court Case, New England Mutual Life Ins. Co. v. Woodworth, may have helped pay for his education. During the period of 1884–1886, he was assistant to S.A. Forbes. From 1886 to 1888 he studied at Harvard University under Hermann August Hagen, who, at the time, was the leading entomologist of the U.S. He returned between 1900 and 1901 and worked under William E. Castle. In 1888, he was appointed entomologist and botanist at the University of Arkansas's Arkansas Agricultural Experiment Station. On September 4, 1889, he married Leonora Stern in Rolla, Missouri, the city where her parents, Edward Stern and Lizzie Hardin Evans Stern, lived. Charles suffered from successive attacks of malaria while in Arkansas. He left there in 1891 to become assistant in entomology at the University of California (now UC Berkeley) where he founded and built up the Division of Entomology. He also participated in the development of the Agricultural Experiment Station, now known as UC Davis, and is also considered the founder of the Entomology Department there.

At Berkeley, he rose to be Assistant Professor in 1891, Associate Professor in 1904, Professor in 1913, and was named Emeritus Professor upon his retirement in 1930.

== Proposal on the use of Drosophila ==
Woodworth is credited with first breeding Drosophila in quantity while he was at Harvard. Thomas Hunt Morgan's Nobel Prize biography says that Woodworth suggested to William E. Castle that Drosophila might be used for genetical work. Castle and his associates used it for their work on the effects of inbreeding, and through them F. E. Lutz became interested in it and the latter introduced it to Morgan, who was looking for a species that could be bred in the very limited space at his command.

== Four years in China ==
While on sabbatical leave in 1918, he was a lecturer at the University of Nanking and honorary professor of entomology at the National Southeastern University at Nanking, China. During his year there he effected a practical control of mosquitoes for the first time in that city's history. He returned for a three-year period in 1921–1924. During this period he organized the Kiangsu Provincial Bureau of Entomology as well as many other things. In the words of the president of the University of Nanking, "He served China in a magnificent way."

== Publications and policy efforts ==
His publications were very extensive and included nearly every field of entomology. A few of his most outstanding works are: "A List of the Insects of California (1903), The Wing Veins of Insects" (1906), "Guide to California Insects" (1913), and "School of Fumigation" (1915). He was the first editor and first contributor to the University of California Publications in Entomology.

He had much to do with the responsible use of pesticides. He proposed and drafted the first California Insecticide Law in 1906, was largely instrumental in securing its passage in 1911, and administered the law until July 1, 1923. Entomological campaigns which he conducted in California concerned the codling moth, the peach twig-borer, citrus insects, grasshoppers, and citrus white fly eradication.

== Family and home ==
Charles and Leonora had four children: Lawrence, Harold, Charles, and Elizabeth. His son, Dr. Charles E. Woodworth, also became an entomologist; he worked for the USDA ARS focusing on the wireworm and served as an entomologist with the Army in the Pacific during World War II with the rank of Major, commanding a unit which cleared swamps.

Their home at 2237 Carleton Street in Berkeley, that he designed, was designated a Berkeley Landmark in 1993. He had many avocations including making telescopes, analyzing chess positions, and researching his extended family's genealogy.

== The C.W. Woodworth Award ==
C.W. was an 1889 charter member of the American Association of Economic Entomologists (an association which merged with the Entomological Society of America, founded 1906, in 1953). The Pacific Branch of the Entomological Society of America selects a member of the society to win the C. W. Woodworth Award based on "outstanding accomplishments in entomology over at least the past 10 years." Here is a nearly complete list of winners since 1969. This award is principally sponsored by his great-grandson, Brian Holden, and his wife, Joann Wilfert, with additional support by Dr. Craig and Kathryn Holden, and Dr. Jim and Betty Woodworth.

== See also ==
- History of model organisms
- Timeline of Entomology - Post 1900
