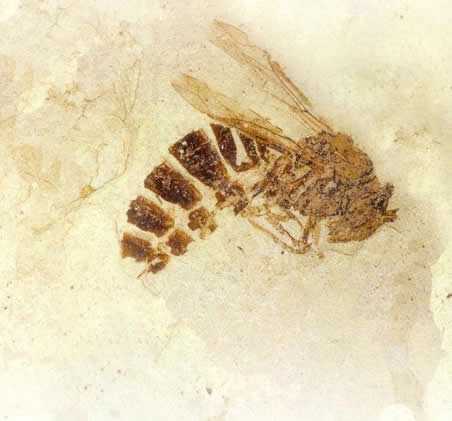
- Palaeovespa florissantia specimen

Scientific classification
- Kingdom: Animalia
- Phylum: Arthropoda
- Clade: Pancrustacea
- Class: Insecta
- Order: Hymenoptera
- Family: Vespidae
- Subfamily: Vespinae
- Genus: †Palaeovespa; Cockerell, 1906

Species
- P. baltica Cockerell, 1909; P. florissantia Cockerell, 1906; P. gillettei Cockerell, 1906; P. relecta Cockerell, 1923; P. menatensis Nel & Auvray, 2006; P. scudderi Cockerell, 1906; P. socialis Pionar, 2005; P. wilsoni Cockerell, 1914

= Palaeovespa =

Palaeovespa Temporal range: Late Thanetian to Early Priabonian 58–34 Ma

Extinct genus of insects

Palaeovespa is an extinct genus of wasp in the Vespidae subfamily Vespinae. The genus currently contains eight species: five from the Priabonian stage Florissant Formation in Colorado, United States, two from the middle Eocene Baltic amber deposits of Europe, and one species from the late Paleocene of France.

== History and classification ==
The genus was first described by Dr. Theodore Cockerell in a 1906 paper published in the Bulletin of the Museum of Comparative Zoology. The genus name is a combination of the Greek palaios, meaning "old" and vespa from the genus Vespa, the type genus of the family Vespidae where Palaeovespa is placed.

Along with the genus description, the paper contained the description of the type species P. florissantia, P. scudderi and P. gillettei all from the Florissant Formation. Cockerell described a fourth species, P. baltica in 1909 from a specimen in Baltic amber. Five years later, in 1914, Cockerell described another species P. wilsoni from Florissant. In 1923, P. relecta was named by Cockerell, bring the species count to six, with five described from Florissant. Palaeovespa gained another species, P. socialis, in 2005 when George Poinar Jr. described a second species found in Baltic amber, while the eighth, and geologically oldest species, P. menatensis, was published by Nel et al (2006).

== Description ==
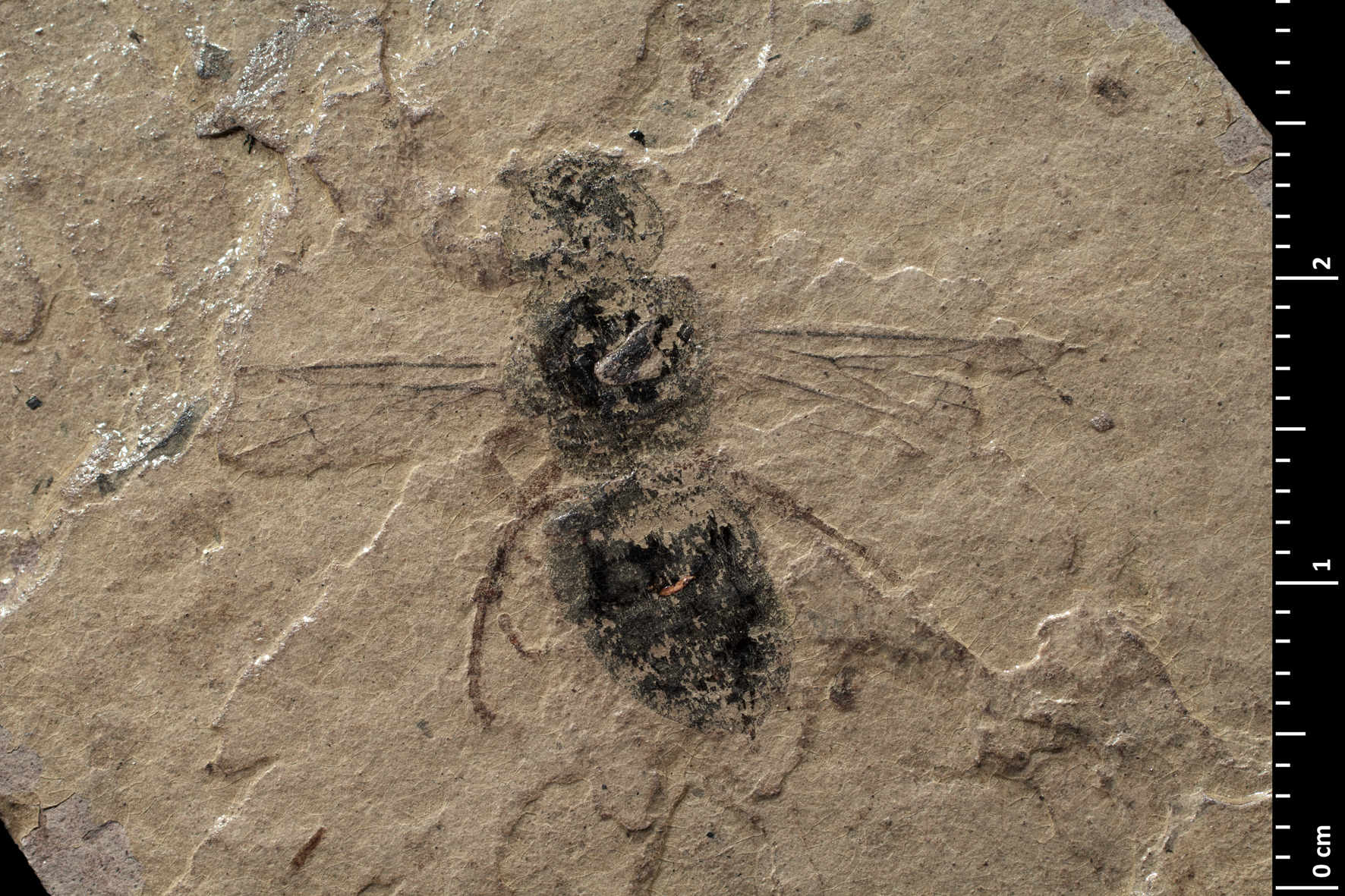
Palaeovespa menatensis holotype

Palaeovespa is most similar to the extant genus Vespa, with which it shares many similar features such as a broad rounded thorax with a sessile abdomen that is broad at the base. The genus however possesses wing venation that is closer to the more primitive genus Polistes. Despite naming P. florissantia as the type species Cockerell noted that not all features of the genus were discernible in the P. forissantia holotype.

=== P. florissantia ===
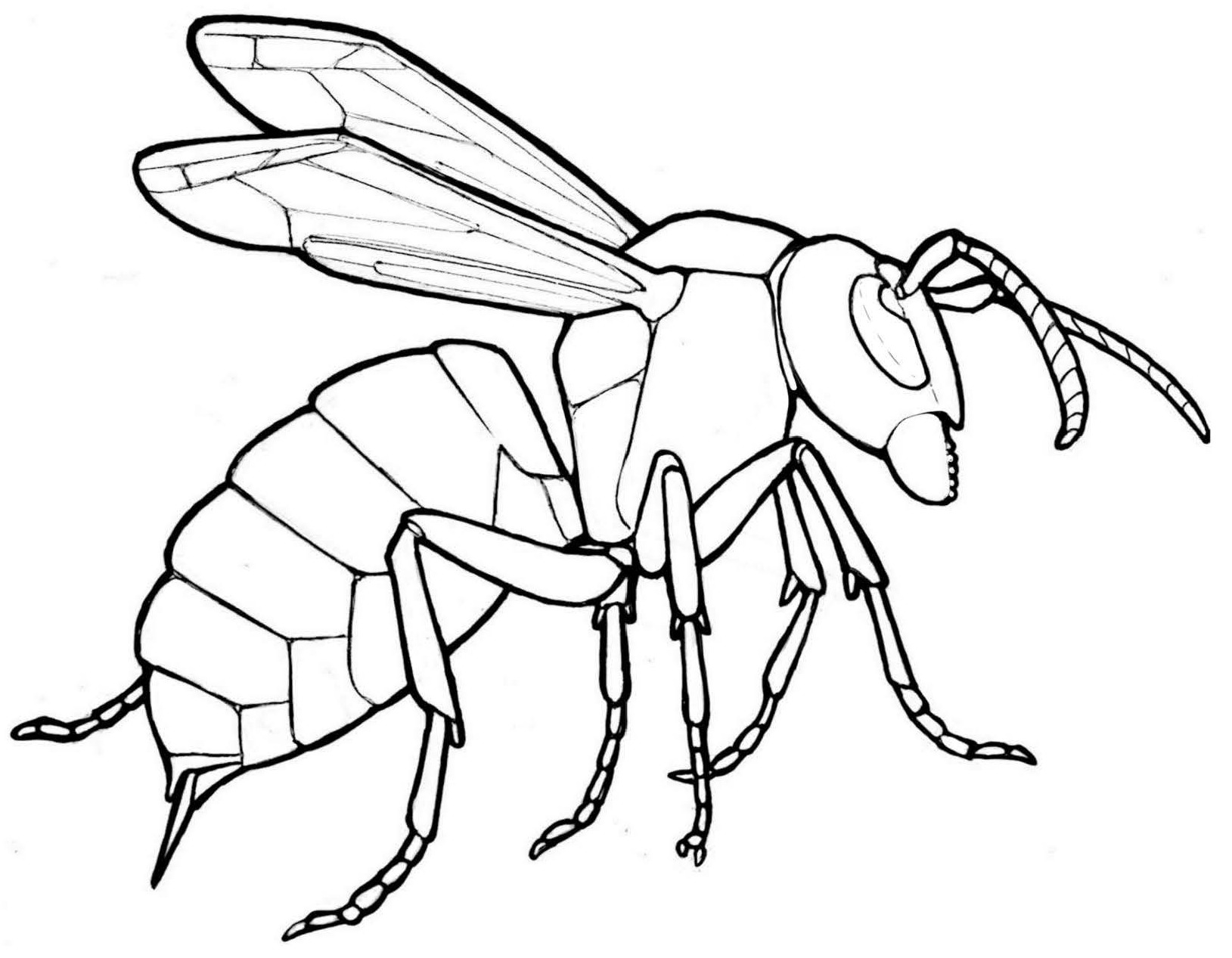
Life restoration

At the time of description in 1906, the holotype for P. florissantia was the largest single hymenopteran specimen that Cockerell had seen from the Florissant Formation. He noted that holotype specimen Museum of Comparative Zoology (MCZ) number 2026 was similar in appearance, on first examination, to a large scoliid wasp but that the specimen was undoubtedly a vespid. P. florissantia was apparently broadly black in color with the hind margins of the abdominal segments pallid in coloration, but displaying no distinct markings. The wings were possibly reddish in coloration. Though the wings are folded, the very long first discoidal, which is unique to members of Vespidae, is visible. The specific epithet is a reference to the Florissant Formation, which produced the specimen.

=== P. scudderi ===
P. scudderi, unlike P. florissantia, was described from two specimens. However only holotype specimen MCZ number 2027 was noted as a type specimen. The second specimen, MCZ number 7738, while used in the description, was not noted as a paratype. The species has eyes that are deeply emarginate like modern Vespa species, but unlike the modern species the eye segment above the emargination is very close to the size of the segment below. Also notable to P. scudderi are the strong vertical striations on the lateral prothorax lobes, a feature not seen in the other Palaeovespa species that Cockerell described in 1906. The head and thorax were dark, most likely black, in life, and the middle leg was black down to the apical third of the femur, at which point it shifts to a lighter tone, probably yellow or red. Cockerell named P. scudderi for Samuel H. Scudder who was the first North American paleoentomologist and collector of numerous Florissant Formation insects.

=== P. gillettei ===
Of the three species first described in 1906, P. gillettei was described from the most specimens, with five specimens being referred to the species in addition to the holotype specimen, MCZ number 2028. This species is smaller and more delicate than either P. florissantia or P. scudderi with a body length of approximately 14.5 millimeters (0.57 in). The mesothorax possibly displayed two longitudinal stripes of yellow. The vein structure of the wings is very similar to that of P. scudderi, while the base of the abdomen is smaller than that of modern Vespa species. There is little flaring in the base of the abdomen, with the broadest part being just past the middle. The costal cell of the forewing shows a distinct dark area similar to the dark area on modern Vespa wings. The species was named in honor of Clarence P. Gillette in recognition of his work on Colorado insects.

=== P. baltica ===
P. baltica is the first of two Palaeovespa species described from Baltic amber and is known only from the type specimen, a single adult female. The species was named in 1909 by Cockerell in a paper describing a number of fossil Hymenoptera housed in the University of Königsberg amber collections. P. baltica is about 16 millimeters (0.63 in) in total length with forewings about 11 mm (0.43 in). The abdomen is "rusty red" in color with the underside darkening towards the apex. The legs are a dark "rusty red" or "yellowish rusty red", while the wings are "soot brown" in color. In the description of P. socialis, Poinar noted the inclusion of the two Baltic amber species in Palaeovespa to be dubious.

=== P. wilsoni ===
In 1914, five years after the publication of P. baltica and eight years after the description of the genus, Cockerell published the fourth Florissant formation species P. wilsoni. This species was described from a single female specimen recovered from shales on the Wilson Ranch near Florissant, Colorado. The size and overall characters are similar to P. gillettei with an overall length of about 15 millimeters (0.59 in) and a forewing length of 9 mm (0.35 in), the head and thorax are black while the abdomen and legs are pale, possibly having been yellow in life. The wings are glassy transparent ("hyaline"), with nearly colorless veins, in contrast to the wings of P. gillettei which have a dark area in the costal region. The wing vein characters were considered distinct enough to discount the possibly of the P. wilsoni holotype being a variant specimen of P. gillettei. Cockerell coined the specific name "wilsoni" in honor of the owners of the Wilson ranch who aided in the fossil-collecting efforts.

=== P. relecta ===
In 1923 Cockerell published his final species of Palaeovespa to be described from the Florissant Formation, P. relecta. The type and only known specimen is part of the Colorado Museum of Natural History collections and was loaned to Cockerell by the museum's director at that time, Jesse D. Figgins. While Cockerell considered the species to be close to P. gillettei, P. relecta is larger. The total length of the holotype is 17.5 millimeters (0.69 in) while the forewings are 10.5 mm (0.41 in) long. P. relecta is noted for having abdominal coloration close to that of modern Vespa, possessing an abdomen that is mostly black with narrow light sutural bands. The head and thorax are black, the antenna ferruginous and darkening at the extreme base. The wings are hyaline with a dusky tint along the upper margin and lightly ferruginous veins.

=== P. socialis ===
P. socialis is the newest addition to the genus and the second species to be described from a Baltic amber specimen. The holotype is a 12.8-millimetre (0.50 in) long female specimen, number H-10-175 in the Poinar Amber Collection housed at Oregon State University. The head is light in coloration with yellow bands around the eyes and mouth parts. The mesosoma is mostly black while the tergites of the abdomen are black on the front portion and yellow on the back portion. The specific name "socialis" is in reference to the probable social habits and nature of the species. Of the two other described Baltic amber Vespinae species, the triangular arrangement of the ocelli separate P. socialis from Vespa dasypodia. While the size difference between P. baltica and P. socialis could be due to the specimen's being from different castes of the same species; the coloration and wing vein differences support the separation into two species. The holotype specimen is preserved with a small section of tissue with prolegs with crochets clenched in the mandibles, indicating the larvae used caterpillars as a source of protein. In his description of the species George Poinar notes the possibility that the Baltic amber species may not belong in Palaeovespa.

=== P. menatensis ===
Oldest known species, described from the Thanetian Menat Formation, a diatomite crater lake deposit in France
