= Euparagia scutellaris =

Scientific classification
- Domain: Eukaryota
- Kingdom: Animalia
- Phylum: Arthropoda
- Class: Insecta
- Order: Hymenoptera
- Family: Vespidae
- Genus: Euparagia
- Species: E. scutellaris

Binomial name
- Euparagia scutellaris Cresson

Species of wasp

Euparagia scutellaris is a species of wasp in the family of Vespidae. It is found in the western United States. It's larvae feed on weevil larvae.
