= Kearney Research and Extension Center =

The University of California's Kearney Research and Extension Center, the largest field station in the UC system, is an active extension facility dedicated to agricultural research. It is located on the border of the cities of Parlier and Reedley, in California's heavily agricultural Great Central Valley.

The Kearney Research and Extension Center (KREC) was dedicated under the name Kearney Horticultural Field Station on May 26, 1965. The 195-acre (0.79 km^{2}) plot of land between Parlier and Reedley called Mosesian Ranch was the site of the new station. More property was added over the years, and by 1985 the station reached its current size of 330 acres (1.3 km^{2}), most of which are under cultivation. Besides fields and orchards, KREC includes laboratories, greenhouses, insectaries, offices, trailers, volatile storage, GIS facility, and a small dormitory for visitors. Its 33 laboratory facilities include a postharvest fruit and vegetable lab, mosquito control lab, and biocontrol quarantine lab.

The main feature of KREC is the Kearney Agricultural Center. It employs 24 full-time research scientists, who are University of California faculty mainly affiliated with the campuses at Davis, Riverside, and Berkeley. Kearney Agricultural Center (KAC) employs an approximate total of 125 employees. Current and ongoing research underway at KAC include projects involved with postharvest technology, mosquito control, citrus pest management, plant breeding, noxious weeds, soil solarization, nematode biology, mealybugs, whitefly, Lygus bug, and groundwater management. Researchers are developing novel and specialty crops, such as blueberries, pitaya, jujube, and caper. Successful past projects include those on dust control, avocado growing, scale insects, and mulching. Many varieties of fruits, nuts, and vegetables have been developed at KAC and are currently grown and sold by farmers.

Also located at KREC is the Central Valley regional headquarters of the University of California Cooperative Extension, which brings the new methods and technologies of developed at the university to the farmers and business people who need it.
