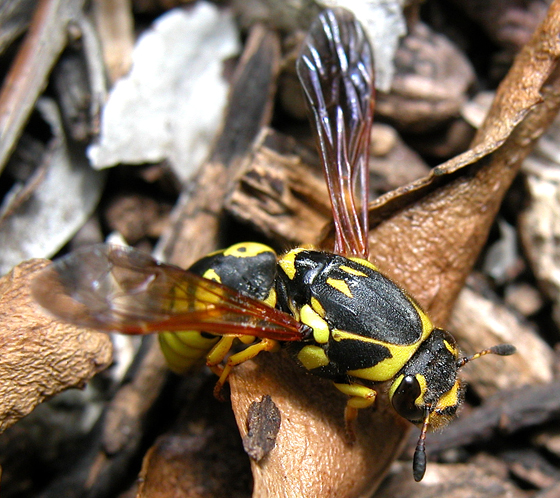
- Pseudomasaris vespoides

Scientific classification
- Domain: Eukaryota
- Kingdom: Animalia
- Phylum: Arthropoda
- Class: Insecta
- Order: Hymenoptera
- Family: Vespidae
- Subfamily: Masarinae

Genera
- Gayellini; Gayella; Paramasaris; Priscomasarini; Priscomasaris; Paragiini; Metaparagia; Paragia; Masarini; Celonites; Ceramiopsis; Ceramius; Jugurtia; Masarina; Masaris; Pseudomasaris; Quartinia; Trimeria

= Pollen wasp =

Pollen wasps

Subfamily of wasps

Pollen wasps, the Masarinae, are unusual wasps that are typically treated as a subfamily of Vespidae, but have in the past sometimes been recognized as a separate family, "Masaridae", which also included the subfamilies Euparagiinae and Gayellinae. It is a small subfamily, unique among wasps in feeding their larvae exclusively with pollen and nectar, in a fashion quite similar to many solitary bees. Most species are black or brown, marked with strikingly contrasting patterns of yellow, white, or red (or combinations thereof). They are most diverse and abundant in the desert regions of southern Africa, but also occur in the deserts of North and South America. Some species of Pseudomasaris in California, such as Pseudomasaris vespoides, bear a remarkable resemblance to yellow jackets, but can be recognized by their strongly clubbed antennae, a characteristic feature of the subfamily. Males have greatly elongated antennae, but still ending in a strong club.

They carry pollen in their crops, and regurgitate it along with nectar when provisioning the cells of their nests, and they lay their eggs in the soupy mass before sealing the cell. The nests are often constructed of mud, or burrows in the ground, and these can have one to multiple individual cells. The nests are commonly located in concealed places, such as under rocks or in crevices.
