= Bohart Museum of Entomology =

Insect museum in California, United States

Coordinates: 38.5352°N 121.7522°W

- Established: 1946
- Location: Davis, California
- Visitors: 12000
- Director: Jason Bond
- Curator: Brennen Dyer
- Website: http://bohart.ucdavis.edu/index.html

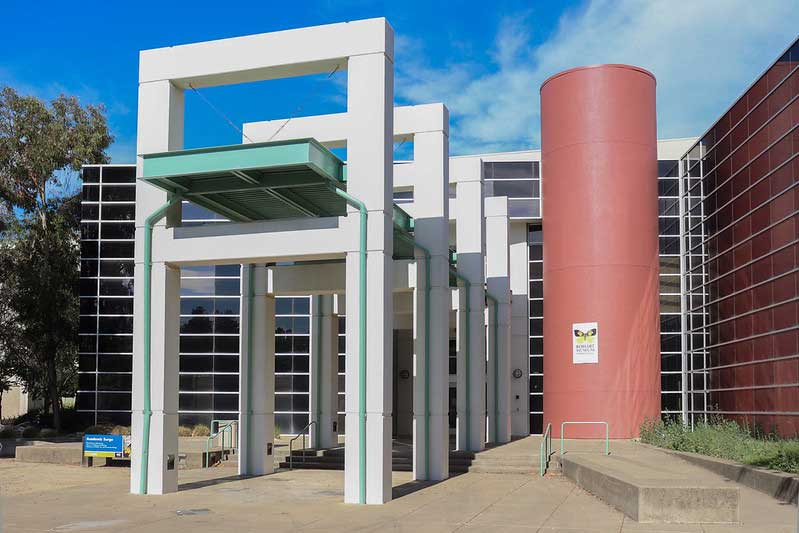
Bohart Museum of Entomology Entrance

The Bohart Museum of Entomology was founded in 1946 on the campus of the University of California, Davis. The museum is currently the seventh largest insect collection in North America with more than seven million specimens of terrestrial and freshwater arthropods. At least 90% of these holdings are insects. The collection is worldwide in scope with the Western Hemisphere, Indonesia, and Australasia particularly well represented.

== Role ==
The principal roles of the museum are to support research at the graduate and undergraduate levels, informatics and diagnostics, and educational outreach. Areas of taxonomic specialization include the worldwide insect order Hymenoptera, freshwater non-insect arthropods, and California insect fauna. Professor Emeritus of entomology Richard M. Bohart was the museum's founder and principal contributor. In 1986 the museum was named in his honor.

The museum is closely tied to the Entomology Department at UC Davis and provides research support for the department. This role is particularly important for the faculty of biological control and medical entomology groups. The museum also houses teaching insect collections for undergraduate level entomology courses taught on campus. The museum houses the California Insect Survey. Lynn Kimsey was the director of the museum from 1989 until her retirement in February 2025. The current director is Professor Jason Bond, who specializes in the evolutionary diversification of terrestrial arthropods.

== Specimen collection ==
Each year an average of 30,000 newly acquired specimens are added to the collection. These specimens come from museum based field studies, university faculty, and student research programs. There is also a considerable number of specimens donated to the museum from the members of the Bohart Museum Society and the external community. 7,400 specimens from the museum are estimated to be on loan each year to domestic and international researchers. Local, national, and international researchers use the museum's collection materials in at least 18 publications per year in addition to the high publication activity of the university staff and associates.

An average of 12,000 visitors come to the Bohart Museum each year.

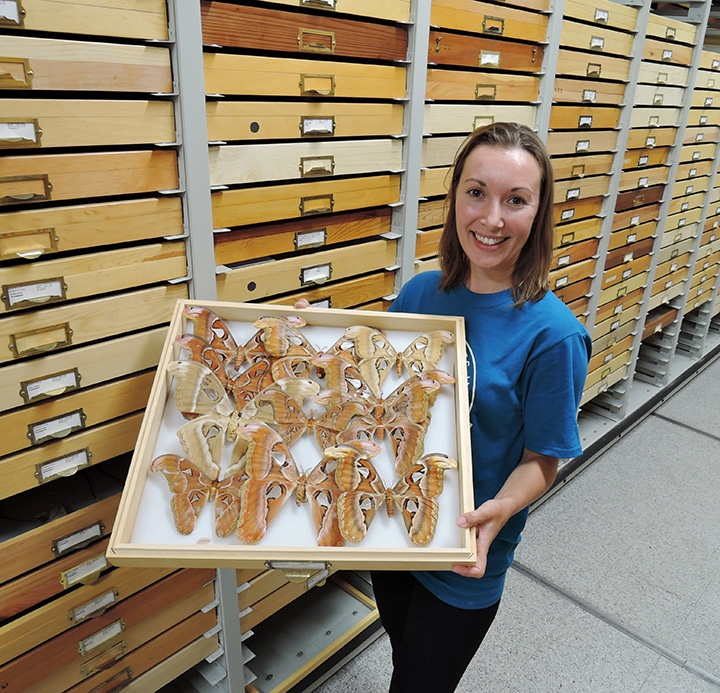
Bohart Museum staff member displays drawer containing Attacus atlas moths
