= Lynn Kimsey =

American entomologist (born 1953)

Lynn Siri Kimsey
- Born: February 1, 1953
- Education: University of California, Davis
- Occupation: Academic entomologist
- Employer: University of California, Davis
- Website: entomology.ucdavis.edu/faculty/facpage.cfm?id=kimsey

Lynn Siri Kimsey is an entomologist, taxonomist, director of the Bohart Museum of Entomology and professor of entomology at the University of California, Davis since 1989. Her specialties are bees and wasps; and insect diversity and evolution.

== Career ==
Kimsey earned a doctorate in entomology from UC Davis in 1979 and joined the faculty of the department of entomology in 1989 as assistant professor. Kimsey served as interim chair of the department from 2008–2009. She holds the title of distinguished professor of entomology. Kimsey was appointed as the director of the Bohart Museum of Entomology, operated by UC Davis, in 1989.

Kimsey has described almost 300 new species. In 2020 she was awarded the C. W. Woodworth Award by the Entomological Society of America.

Her husband Robert Kimsey is a forensic entomologist in the UC Davis Department of Entomology.

== Research ==
Kimsey studies the biology and evolution of insects, with a primary focus on the systematics and phylogeny of families Tiphiidae, Chrysididae, Sphecidae, Pompilidae and Apidae. In addition, she researches the mating behavior of wasps and bees. Nicknamed by her colleagues, "The Wasp Woman," Kimsey is one of only a few scientists in the world who can identify chrysidid or tiphiid wasps to species. The bulk of her research encompasses the discovery of new species of wasps since only about 60% of species have been described. Kimsey has named 250 new species and 17 new genera.

Kimsey examines global patterns of evolution in the wasp family Tiphiidae, which has eight subfamilies. Chrysalid wasps are a family of over 3000 species of wasps known commonly as gold wasps or cuckoo wasps. These small wasps lay eggs in the chrysalis of butterflies or moths or the nest of unrelated species. Kimey's book Chrysalid Wasps of the World presents an overview of the family, characterizing 84 genera and four subfamilies of these wasps.

Through her work at the Bohart Museum, Kimsey catalogs and examines the insect diversity of California and how this diversity contributes to local and global patterns of biodiversity. She has more than 100 peer reviewed publications.

Kimsey served as part of a team of UC Davis scientists and collaborators who received a five-year $4 million grant in 2008 to study the biodiversity of fungi, bacteria, plants, insects and vertebrates on Sulawesi, an Indonesian island near Borneo. There, biodiversity is considered threatened by logging operations and mining developments. The scientists planned to screen microbes and plants for applications to human health and energy needs. The aims of the project include:

1. undertake surveys of micro- and macro-organisms in forests of southeastern Sulawesi, Indonesia
2. explore their potential as sources of natural products to address human health and bioenergy issues
3. develop recommendations for conservation strategies
4. encourage local conservation education and outreach efforts that are ecologically, economically, and socio-politically sound
5. develop equitable, effective international agreements relating to technology and materials transfer and benefit sharing. resources

In Sulawesi, Kimsey discovered the largest wasp species recorded to date, a so-called "monster wasp" with jaws that exceed the length of its limbs. The male wasp grows to two and a half inches long (6.35 cm). Kimsey named this wasp species Megalara garuda after Garuda, the national symbol of Indonesia, a giant, bird-like creature. Kimsey published the description of one additional species of wasp discovered in Sulawesi called Mahinda sulawesiensis. Kimsey has brought back hundreds of possible new species from the three trips to Sulawesi that have yet to be cataloged.

Kimsey was a high school student when she conducted a survey of intertidal invertebrates of San Francisco Bay over 13 months from 1970–1971. She collaborated with James Carleton to identify 139 living insect species. The description of this legacy collection was published in 2021.

== Impact and legacy ==
In 2020, she became the 52nd recipient of the C. W. Woodworth Award from the Entomological Society of America.

Kimsey received the UCLA Senate Distinguished Scholarly Service Award in 2016.

As Director, Kimsey developed and expanded the Bohart Museum to reach over 7000 students through field trips and outreach events. Under her guidance, the Museum features a gift shop with an insect petting zoo.

In 2003, Kimsey's expertise in identifying insects on a rental car was instrumental for the FBI by providing evidence in the murder trial of Vincent Brothers. She identified insects that were consistent with two major automotive routes between California and Kansas; her data supported court testimony that the round trip drive accounted for the 4,500 miles on the rental car. This case revived interest in insects in forensic investigation.

Kimsey started an insect identification hotline for California residents to phone in to aid in insect identification and potentially, pest control measures. The hotline received about 10 calls per day at a charge of $3.00 for the first minute and $1 per minute thereafter.

Kimsey freely shares her expertise with the California Horticulture Society, among other local organizations.

Kimsey is the only entomologist to work with the NASA SPLAT/Boeing group to research reduction in bug splats and increase fuel efficiency on aircraft. Partly as a result of her research, NASA engineers developed surfaces to repel bugs. Only a small number of species including flower flies, aphids, thrips, muscid flies, midges, mosquitoes and love bugs cause the bulk of the splats.

From 2010–2015, the USDA funded the California Insect Survey (CIS) which was transferred to UC Davis. Kimsey is currently editor of the Bulletin of the California Insect Survey.
