= Richard M. Bohart =

American entomologist

Richard Mitchell Bohart (September 28, 1913 – February 1, 2007) was an American entomologist and professor at the University of California, Davis. From 1963 to 1967 he served as chair of the Department of Entomology for the University of California, Davis.

Bohart's contributions to the Department of Entomology led to the dedication of the on campus Bohart Museum of Entomology, named after him in 1986.

== Early life ==
Bohart was born in Palo Alto, California, in 1913. As a child he had many interests: playing around with clay, looking at pretty woman, playing sports, and collecting fossils, rocks and bugs. He was known as "Dick" to friends and family.

== Research ==
Bohart's experiences in butterfly collecting transitioned to a more scientific endeavor after making an insect collection to satisfy requirements for a University of California, Berkeley field course in entomology. He found a bee (Andrena) which had a sack-like parasite protruding from its abdomen which was identified by E. C. VanDyke as a female Stylops (order Strepsiptera). It was the subject of his Ph.D. thesis in 1938.

After he was married, in 1939, and moved to West Los Angeles, Bohart was doing research and teaching at the University of California, Los Angeles. There Bohart was researching the sod webworm that was infesting his own front yard lawn from 1938 to 1941.

In November 1942 Bohart was drafted into the US Army then transferred into the US Navy Medical Corps as an ensign. Here he taught malaria and mosquito control at Camp LeJeune in Jacksonville, North Carolina, and then at Marine base, Camp Perry in Williamsburg, Virginia. In the spring of 1944 Bohart was transferred to Washington, D.C., and assigned to Naval Medical Research Unit #2 housed at the National Academy of Sciences. Almost immediately Bohart was sent to Orlando and Tallahassee, Florida, to study mosquitoes for a month. In the fall of 1944 Bohart was assigned abroad to Guam then Okinawa for the purposes of malaria control. In the fall of 1945 Bohart remained in the navy to complete his research on mosquitoes. In the spring of 1946 Bohart was released from the navy with the rank of lieutenant commander and returned to the University of California, Los Angeles.

The number of journal article publications authored by Bohart total over 200 over his research career.

== Career ==
Richard Bohart transferred to the University of California, Davis in 1946. As the Davis campus began to declare administrative independence from the campus at Berkeley the departments of entomology at both campuses became independently governed. Bohart became vice chairman of the Davis campus Department of Entomology in 1957. From 1963 to 1967 Bohart served as chair for the Department of Entomology at UC Davis.

During the time Bohart spent at the University of California, Davis, he contributed in building the university's insect collection. In the early 1940s the insect collection used for study at UC Davis had a limited number of specimens available. The university's commitment to establish a research-oriented collection in 1946 required that the collection be expanded. Bohart contributed insects in the orders of Diptera, Hymenoptera and Strepsiptera. His interest in aculeate wasps contributed to how comprehensive the collection has become today. The collection is now housed in the university's Bohart Museum of Entomology and is the seventh largest insect collection in North America.

In 2001 Bohart married Chilean entomologist Elizabeth Arias Tobar, who was a graduate student at the Bohart Museum. Elizabeth is a coleopterologist who works at the Essig Museum of Entomology (UC Berkeley).

== See also ==
- Category:Taxa named by Richard M. Bohart
