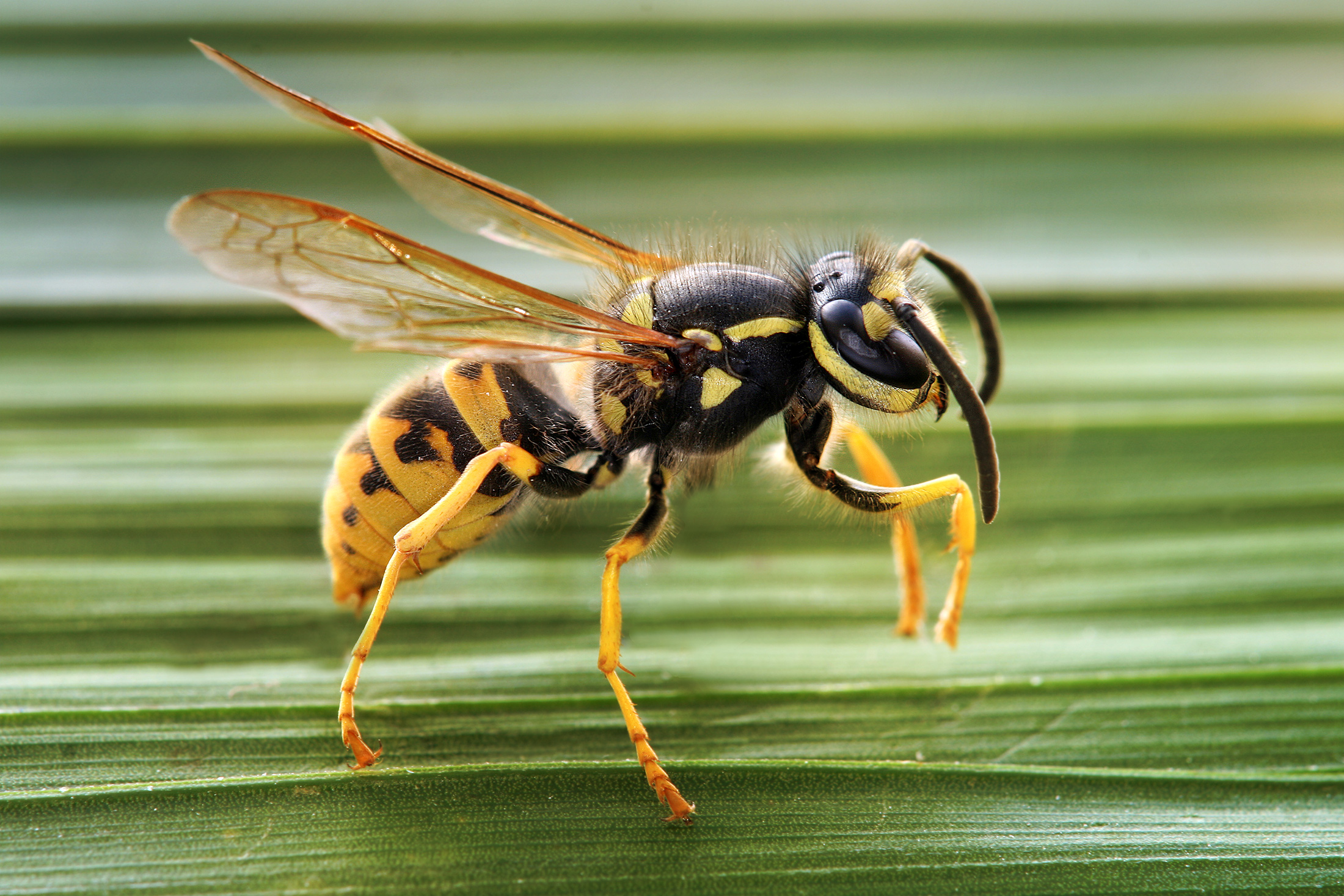
- Vespula germanica (Vespinae)

Scientific classification
- Kingdom: Animalia
- Phylum: Arthropoda
- Clade: Pancrustacea
- Class: Insecta
- Order: Hymenoptera
- Superfamily: Vespoidea
- Family: Vespidae; Latreille, 1802

Subfamilies
- Eumeninae (potter wasps); Euparagiinae; Gayellinae; Masarinae (pollen wasps); Polistinae (paper wasp); Stenogastrinae (hover wasp); Vespinae (yellowjackets, hornets); Zethinae; †Priorvespinae; †Protovespinae

= Vespidae =

Vespidae Temporal range: Aptian–Recent

Family of insects

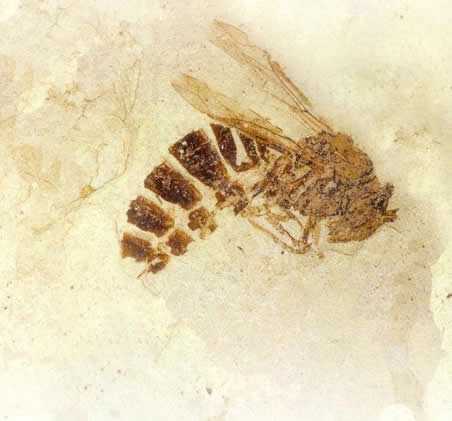
Palaeovespa florissantia, late Eocene

The Vespidae are a large (nearly 5000 species), diverse, cosmopolitan family of wasps, including nearly all the eusocial wasps (such as Polistes fuscatus, Vespa orientalis, and Vespula germanica) and many solitary wasps. Each social wasp colony includes a queen and a number of female workers with varying degrees of sterility relative to the queen. In temperate social species, colonies usually last only one year, dying at the onset of winter. New queens and males (drones) are produced towards the end of the summer, and after mating, the queens hibernate over winter in cracks or other sheltered locations. The nests of most species are constructed out of mud, but polistines and vespines use plant fibers, chewed to form a sort of paper (also true of some stenogastrines). Many species are pollen vectors contributing to the pollination of several plants, being potential or even effective pollinators, while others are notable predators of pest insect species, and a few species are invasive pests.

The subfamilies Polistinae and Vespinae are composed solely of eusocial species, while the Eumeninae, Euparagiinae, Gayellinae, Masarinae and Zethinae are all solitary with the exception of a few communal and several subsocial species. The Stenogastrinae are facultatively eusocial, considering nests may have one or several adult females; in cases where the nest is shared by multiple females (typically, a mother and her daughters) there is reproductive division of labor and cooperative brood care.

In the Polistinae and Vespinae, rather than consuming prey directly, prey are premasticated and fed to the larvae, which in return, produce a clear liquid (with high amino acid content) for the adults to consume; the exact amino acid composition varies considerably among species, but it is considered to contribute substantially to adult nutrition.

Fossils are known since Aptian of the Early Cretaceous, with several described species from Cretaceous amber.

== Gallery ==
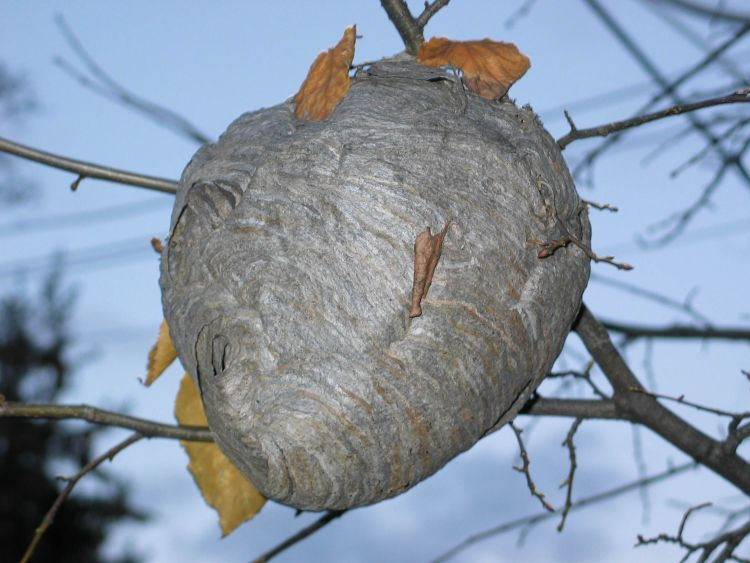
Median wasp nest

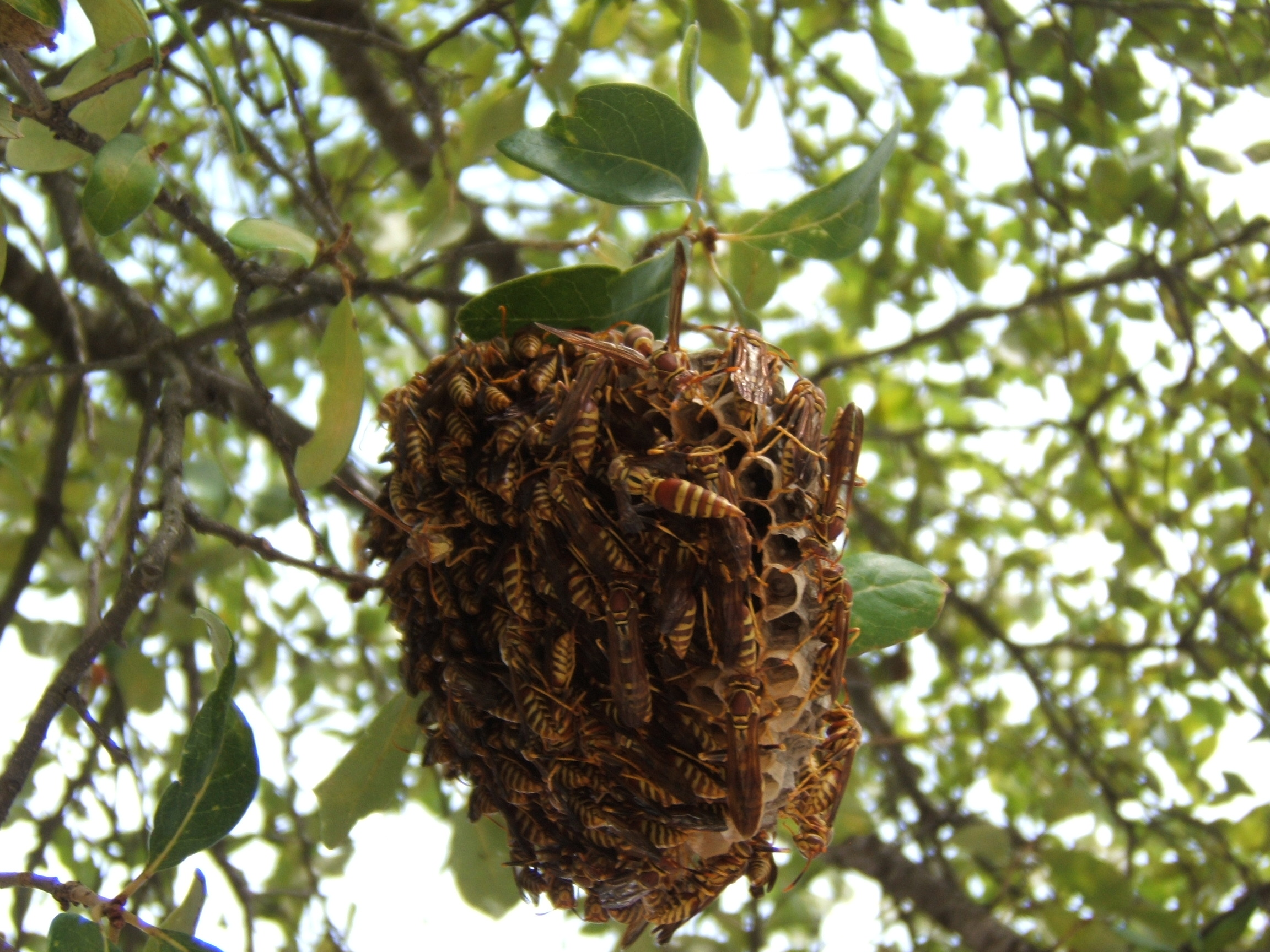
Polistes nest

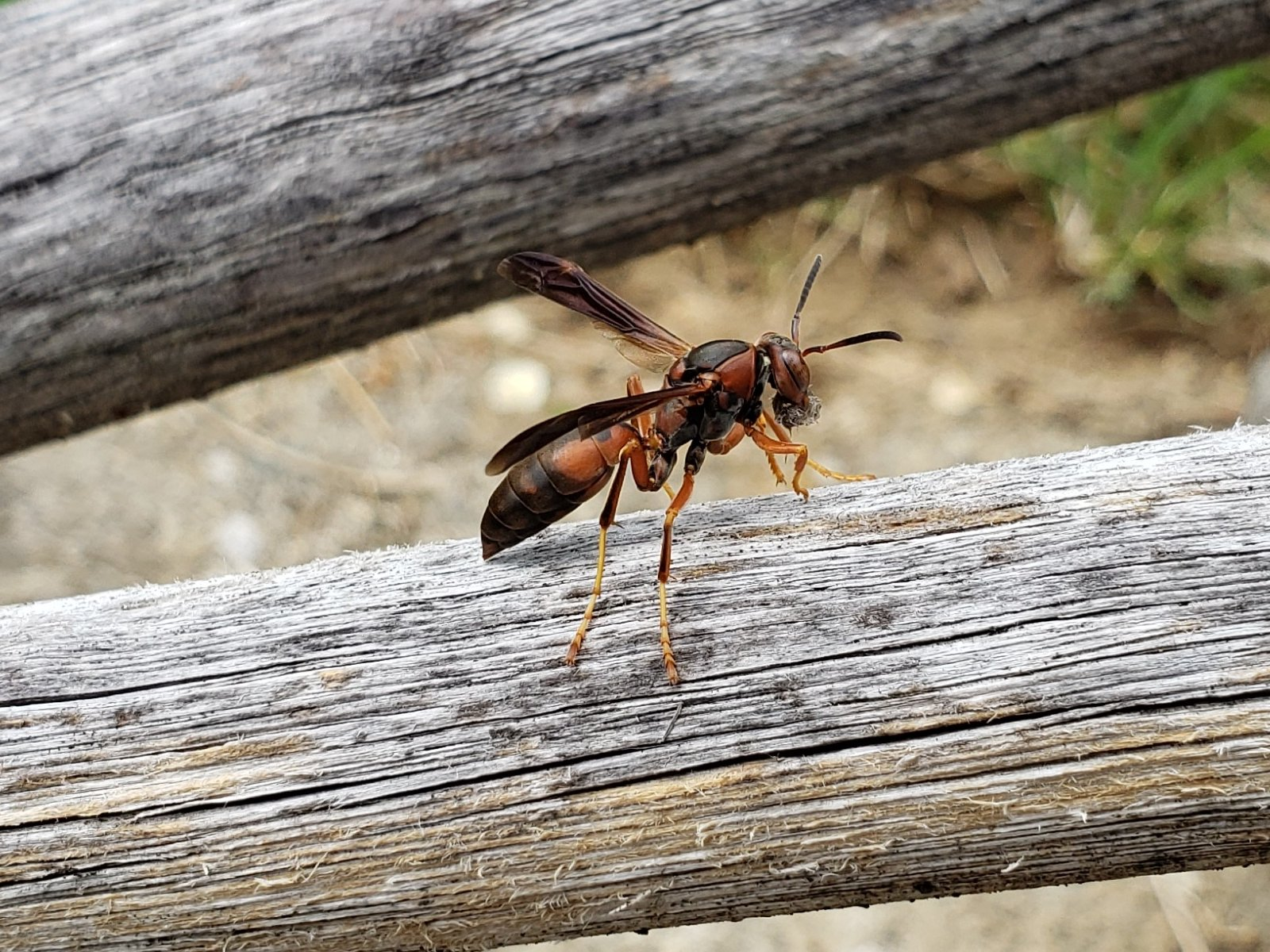
Polistes wasp carrying a bit of wood from an old rake handle

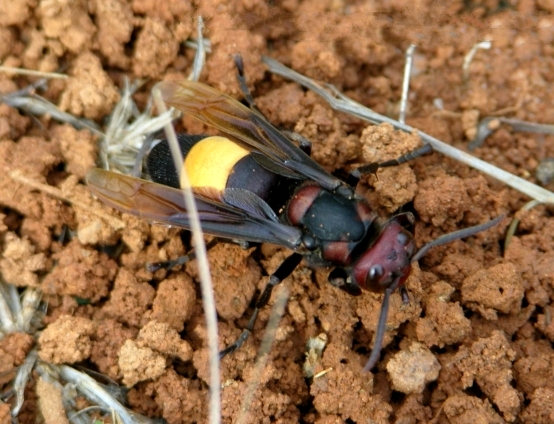
Vespa tropica from India

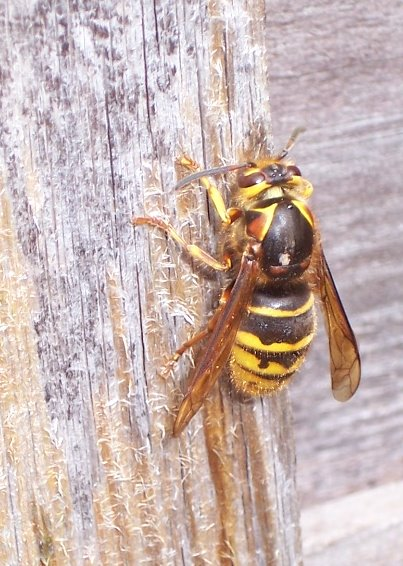
Dolichovespula media (a European tree wasp) stripping wood from a fence for use in nest construction
